

165001–165100 

|-bgcolor=#fefefe
| 165001 ||  || — || January 28, 2000 || Kitt Peak || Spacewatch || — || align=right | 1.8 km || 
|-id=002 bgcolor=#E9E9E9
| 165002 ||  || — || January 26, 2000 || Kitt Peak || Spacewatch || XIZ || align=right | 2.1 km || 
|-id=003 bgcolor=#E9E9E9
| 165003 ||  || — || January 21, 2000 || Socorro || LINEAR || — || align=right | 5.0 km || 
|-id=004 bgcolor=#E9E9E9
| 165004 ||  || — || February 2, 2000 || Socorro || LINEAR || AEO || align=right | 2.2 km || 
|-id=005 bgcolor=#E9E9E9
| 165005 ||  || — || February 2, 2000 || Socorro || LINEAR || — || align=right | 4.5 km || 
|-id=006 bgcolor=#E9E9E9
| 165006 ||  || — || February 3, 2000 || Socorro || LINEAR || — || align=right | 2.4 km || 
|-id=007 bgcolor=#E9E9E9
| 165007 ||  || — || February 2, 2000 || Socorro || LINEAR || — || align=right | 2.6 km || 
|-id=008 bgcolor=#E9E9E9
| 165008 ||  || — || February 2, 2000 || Socorro || LINEAR || — || align=right | 2.7 km || 
|-id=009 bgcolor=#E9E9E9
| 165009 ||  || — || February 2, 2000 || Socorro || LINEAR || INO || align=right | 1.8 km || 
|-id=010 bgcolor=#E9E9E9
| 165010 ||  || — || February 8, 2000 || Kitt Peak || Spacewatch || — || align=right | 4.8 km || 
|-id=011 bgcolor=#E9E9E9
| 165011 ||  || — || February 4, 2000 || Socorro || LINEAR || JUN || align=right | 1.9 km || 
|-id=012 bgcolor=#E9E9E9
| 165012 ||  || — || February 4, 2000 || Socorro || LINEAR || EUN || align=right | 2.6 km || 
|-id=013 bgcolor=#E9E9E9
| 165013 ||  || — || February 6, 2000 || Socorro || LINEAR || — || align=right | 4.4 km || 
|-id=014 bgcolor=#E9E9E9
| 165014 ||  || — || February 7, 2000 || Kitt Peak || Spacewatch || GEF || align=right | 4.6 km || 
|-id=015 bgcolor=#E9E9E9
| 165015 ||  || — || February 8, 2000 || Kitt Peak || Spacewatch || PAD || align=right | 4.3 km || 
|-id=016 bgcolor=#E9E9E9
| 165016 ||  || — || February 8, 2000 || Kitt Peak || Spacewatch || — || align=right | 2.4 km || 
|-id=017 bgcolor=#E9E9E9
| 165017 ||  || — || February 5, 2000 || Catalina || CSS || — || align=right | 3.2 km || 
|-id=018 bgcolor=#E9E9E9
| 165018 ||  || — || February 11, 2000 || Kitt Peak || Spacewatch || — || align=right | 2.4 km || 
|-id=019 bgcolor=#E9E9E9
| 165019 ||  || — || February 2, 2000 || Catalina || CSS || — || align=right | 2.1 km || 
|-id=020 bgcolor=#E9E9E9
| 165020 ||  || — || February 3, 2000 || Socorro || LINEAR || MRX || align=right | 2.0 km || 
|-id=021 bgcolor=#E9E9E9
| 165021 ||  || — || February 3, 2000 || Kitt Peak || Spacewatch || — || align=right | 2.6 km || 
|-id=022 bgcolor=#E9E9E9
| 165022 ||  || — || February 3, 2000 || Kitt Peak || Spacewatch || — || align=right | 2.7 km || 
|-id=023 bgcolor=#d6d6d6
| 165023 ||  || — || February 3, 2000 || Kitt Peak || Spacewatch || — || align=right | 3.6 km || 
|-id=024 bgcolor=#d6d6d6
| 165024 ||  || — || February 3, 2000 || Kitt Peak || Spacewatch || CHA || align=right | 2.6 km || 
|-id=025 bgcolor=#E9E9E9
| 165025 ||  || — || February 28, 2000 || Kitt Peak || Spacewatch || — || align=right | 2.8 km || 
|-id=026 bgcolor=#E9E9E9
| 165026 ||  || — || February 26, 2000 || Kitt Peak || Spacewatch || HOF || align=right | 3.1 km || 
|-id=027 bgcolor=#d6d6d6
| 165027 ||  || — || February 27, 2000 || Kitt Peak || Spacewatch || — || align=right | 3.9 km || 
|-id=028 bgcolor=#E9E9E9
| 165028 ||  || — || February 29, 2000 || Socorro || LINEAR || DOR || align=right | 3.9 km || 
|-id=029 bgcolor=#E9E9E9
| 165029 ||  || — || February 29, 2000 || Socorro || LINEAR || DOR || align=right | 5.2 km || 
|-id=030 bgcolor=#E9E9E9
| 165030 ||  || — || February 29, 2000 || Socorro || LINEAR || NEM || align=right | 3.9 km || 
|-id=031 bgcolor=#E9E9E9
| 165031 ||  || — || February 29, 2000 || Socorro || LINEAR || — || align=right | 2.2 km || 
|-id=032 bgcolor=#E9E9E9
| 165032 ||  || — || February 29, 2000 || Socorro || LINEAR || MRX || align=right | 1.9 km || 
|-id=033 bgcolor=#E9E9E9
| 165033 ||  || — || February 29, 2000 || Socorro || LINEAR || — || align=right | 4.2 km || 
|-id=034 bgcolor=#d6d6d6
| 165034 ||  || — || February 29, 2000 || Socorro || LINEAR || FIR || align=right | 4.7 km || 
|-id=035 bgcolor=#d6d6d6
| 165035 ||  || — || February 29, 2000 || Socorro || LINEAR || EOS || align=right | 2.8 km || 
|-id=036 bgcolor=#E9E9E9
| 165036 ||  || — || February 29, 2000 || Socorro || LINEAR || GEF || align=right | 2.5 km || 
|-id=037 bgcolor=#d6d6d6
| 165037 ||  || — || February 25, 2000 || Kitt Peak || Spacewatch || EUP || align=right | 5.1 km || 
|-id=038 bgcolor=#E9E9E9
| 165038 ||  || — || February 26, 2000 || Kitt Peak || Spacewatch || HEN || align=right | 1.6 km || 
|-id=039 bgcolor=#E9E9E9
| 165039 ||  || — || February 28, 2000 || Socorro || LINEAR || — || align=right | 5.1 km || 
|-id=040 bgcolor=#E9E9E9
| 165040 ||  || — || February 29, 2000 || Socorro || LINEAR || — || align=right | 1.6 km || 
|-id=041 bgcolor=#E9E9E9
| 165041 ||  || — || February 29, 2000 || Socorro || LINEAR || AGN || align=right | 2.3 km || 
|-id=042 bgcolor=#E9E9E9
| 165042 ||  || — || February 29, 2000 || Socorro || LINEAR || GAL || align=right | 2.8 km || 
|-id=043 bgcolor=#E9E9E9
| 165043 ||  || — || February 27, 2000 || Kitt Peak || Spacewatch || — || align=right | 3.6 km || 
|-id=044 bgcolor=#d6d6d6
| 165044 ||  || — || March 3, 2000 || Socorro || LINEAR || 3:2 || align=right | 7.7 km || 
|-id=045 bgcolor=#d6d6d6
| 165045 ||  || — || March 3, 2000 || Socorro || LINEAR || — || align=right | 4.7 km || 
|-id=046 bgcolor=#E9E9E9
| 165046 ||  || — || March 4, 2000 || Socorro || LINEAR || GEF || align=right | 2.2 km || 
|-id=047 bgcolor=#E9E9E9
| 165047 ||  || — || March 5, 2000 || Socorro || LINEAR || — || align=right | 3.5 km || 
|-id=048 bgcolor=#E9E9E9
| 165048 ||  || — || March 8, 2000 || Socorro || LINEAR || — || align=right | 3.9 km || 
|-id=049 bgcolor=#d6d6d6
| 165049 ||  || — || March 8, 2000 || Socorro || LINEAR || BRA || align=right | 2.7 km || 
|-id=050 bgcolor=#d6d6d6
| 165050 ||  || — || March 9, 2000 || Socorro || LINEAR || ALA || align=right | 5.9 km || 
|-id=051 bgcolor=#d6d6d6
| 165051 ||  || — || March 3, 2000 || Kitt Peak || Spacewatch || KOR || align=right | 1.7 km || 
|-id=052 bgcolor=#d6d6d6
| 165052 ||  || — || March 9, 2000 || Socorro || LINEAR || — || align=right | 4.0 km || 
|-id=053 bgcolor=#E9E9E9
| 165053 ||  || — || March 10, 2000 || Socorro || LINEAR || — || align=right | 4.1 km || 
|-id=054 bgcolor=#d6d6d6
| 165054 ||  || — || March 10, 2000 || Socorro || LINEAR || — || align=right | 3.6 km || 
|-id=055 bgcolor=#E9E9E9
| 165055 ||  || — || March 5, 2000 || Socorro || LINEAR || — || align=right | 2.7 km || 
|-id=056 bgcolor=#E9E9E9
| 165056 ||  || — || March 5, 2000 || Socorro || LINEAR || — || align=right | 4.8 km || 
|-id=057 bgcolor=#d6d6d6
| 165057 ||  || — || March 11, 2000 || Socorro || LINEAR || — || align=right | 4.1 km || 
|-id=058 bgcolor=#d6d6d6
| 165058 ||  || — || March 12, 2000 || Kitt Peak || Spacewatch || — || align=right | 4.5 km || 
|-id=059 bgcolor=#d6d6d6
| 165059 ||  || — || March 14, 2000 || Kitt Peak || Spacewatch || KOR || align=right | 1.8 km || 
|-id=060 bgcolor=#E9E9E9
| 165060 ||  || — || March 10, 2000 || Kitt Peak || Spacewatch || HOF || align=right | 5.3 km || 
|-id=061 bgcolor=#E9E9E9
| 165061 ||  || — || March 10, 2000 || Kitt Peak || Spacewatch || HEN || align=right | 2.0 km || 
|-id=062 bgcolor=#E9E9E9
| 165062 ||  || — || March 11, 2000 || Anderson Mesa || LONEOS || — || align=right | 3.2 km || 
|-id=063 bgcolor=#E9E9E9
| 165063 ||  || — || March 4, 2000 || Socorro || LINEAR || — || align=right | 3.7 km || 
|-id=064 bgcolor=#d6d6d6
| 165064 ||  || — || March 3, 2000 || Socorro || LINEAR || — || align=right | 5.4 km || 
|-id=065 bgcolor=#E9E9E9
| 165065 ||  || — || March 4, 2000 || Socorro || LINEAR || — || align=right | 4.8 km || 
|-id=066 bgcolor=#E9E9E9
| 165066 ||  || — || March 1, 2000 || Catalina || CSS || — || align=right | 3.3 km || 
|-id=067 bgcolor=#E9E9E9
| 165067 Pauls ||  ||  || March 4, 2000 || Apache Point || SDSS || JUN || align=right | 1.4 km || 
|-id=068 bgcolor=#d6d6d6
| 165068 || 2000 FV || — || March 26, 2000 || Prescott || P. G. Comba || — || align=right | 5.4 km || 
|-id=069 bgcolor=#d6d6d6
| 165069 ||  || — || March 29, 2000 || Kitt Peak || Spacewatch || — || align=right | 2.8 km || 
|-id=070 bgcolor=#d6d6d6
| 165070 ||  || — || March 29, 2000 || Kitt Peak || Spacewatch || — || align=right | 6.6 km || 
|-id=071 bgcolor=#E9E9E9
| 165071 ||  || — || March 29, 2000 || Socorro || LINEAR || MIT || align=right | 4.4 km || 
|-id=072 bgcolor=#d6d6d6
| 165072 ||  || — || March 27, 2000 || Anderson Mesa || LONEOS || EOS || align=right | 4.4 km || 
|-id=073 bgcolor=#E9E9E9
| 165073 ||  || — || March 27, 2000 || Anderson Mesa || LONEOS || MRX || align=right | 1.9 km || 
|-id=074 bgcolor=#E9E9E9
| 165074 ||  || — || March 29, 2000 || Socorro || LINEAR || — || align=right | 3.7 km || 
|-id=075 bgcolor=#d6d6d6
| 165075 ||  || — || March 26, 2000 || Anderson Mesa || LONEOS || — || align=right | 5.6 km || 
|-id=076 bgcolor=#E9E9E9
| 165076 ||  || — || March 29, 2000 || Socorro || LINEAR || GEF || align=right | 2.0 km || 
|-id=077 bgcolor=#E9E9E9
| 165077 ||  || — || March 25, 2000 || Kitt Peak || Spacewatch || AGN || align=right | 1.8 km || 
|-id=078 bgcolor=#E9E9E9
| 165078 ||  || — || April 5, 2000 || Socorro || LINEAR || GEF || align=right | 2.0 km || 
|-id=079 bgcolor=#d6d6d6
| 165079 ||  || — || April 5, 2000 || Socorro || LINEAR || EOS || align=right | 2.9 km || 
|-id=080 bgcolor=#d6d6d6
| 165080 ||  || — || April 5, 2000 || Socorro || LINEAR || — || align=right | 3.8 km || 
|-id=081 bgcolor=#d6d6d6
| 165081 ||  || — || April 5, 2000 || Socorro || LINEAR || — || align=right | 4.2 km || 
|-id=082 bgcolor=#d6d6d6
| 165082 ||  || — || April 5, 2000 || Socorro || LINEAR || — || align=right | 5.9 km || 
|-id=083 bgcolor=#d6d6d6
| 165083 ||  || — || April 5, 2000 || Socorro || LINEAR || — || align=right | 5.3 km || 
|-id=084 bgcolor=#d6d6d6
| 165084 ||  || — || April 5, 2000 || Socorro || LINEAR || KOR || align=right | 3.1 km || 
|-id=085 bgcolor=#d6d6d6
| 165085 ||  || — || April 5, 2000 || Socorro || LINEAR || — || align=right | 6.0 km || 
|-id=086 bgcolor=#d6d6d6
| 165086 ||  || — || April 5, 2000 || Socorro || LINEAR || — || align=right | 4.5 km || 
|-id=087 bgcolor=#d6d6d6
| 165087 ||  || — || April 5, 2000 || Socorro || LINEAR || — || align=right | 4.5 km || 
|-id=088 bgcolor=#d6d6d6
| 165088 ||  || — || April 5, 2000 || Socorro || LINEAR || — || align=right | 5.2 km || 
|-id=089 bgcolor=#d6d6d6
| 165089 ||  || — || April 5, 2000 || Socorro || LINEAR || THM || align=right | 3.8 km || 
|-id=090 bgcolor=#d6d6d6
| 165090 ||  || — || April 5, 2000 || Socorro || LINEAR || — || align=right | 6.3 km || 
|-id=091 bgcolor=#d6d6d6
| 165091 ||  || — || April 5, 2000 || Socorro || LINEAR || THM || align=right | 3.8 km || 
|-id=092 bgcolor=#d6d6d6
| 165092 ||  || — || April 6, 2000 || Socorro || LINEAR || — || align=right | 6.8 km || 
|-id=093 bgcolor=#d6d6d6
| 165093 ||  || — || April 4, 2000 || Socorro || LINEAR || EUP || align=right | 6.9 km || 
|-id=094 bgcolor=#E9E9E9
| 165094 ||  || — || April 4, 2000 || Socorro || LINEAR || — || align=right | 4.4 km || 
|-id=095 bgcolor=#d6d6d6
| 165095 ||  || — || April 3, 2000 || Anderson Mesa || LONEOS || — || align=right | 3.0 km || 
|-id=096 bgcolor=#d6d6d6
| 165096 ||  || — || April 5, 2000 || Kitt Peak || Spacewatch || — || align=right | 3.8 km || 
|-id=097 bgcolor=#E9E9E9
| 165097 ||  || — || April 5, 2000 || Kitt Peak || Spacewatch || AGN || align=right | 2.0 km || 
|-id=098 bgcolor=#d6d6d6
| 165098 ||  || — || April 12, 2000 || Haleakala || NEAT || Tj (2.91) || align=right | 5.1 km || 
|-id=099 bgcolor=#d6d6d6
| 165099 ||  || — || April 6, 2000 || Anderson Mesa || LONEOS || — || align=right | 5.2 km || 
|-id=100 bgcolor=#d6d6d6
| 165100 || 2000 HV || — || April 24, 2000 || Kitt Peak || Spacewatch || — || align=right | 4.0 km || 
|}

165101–165200 

|-bgcolor=#d6d6d6
| 165101 ||  || — || April 26, 2000 || Kitt Peak || Spacewatch || — || align=right | 5.2 km || 
|-id=102 bgcolor=#d6d6d6
| 165102 ||  || — || April 24, 2000 || Kitt Peak || Spacewatch || — || align=right | 4.7 km || 
|-id=103 bgcolor=#d6d6d6
| 165103 ||  || — || April 24, 2000 || Anderson Mesa || LONEOS || TRE || align=right | 5.3 km || 
|-id=104 bgcolor=#d6d6d6
| 165104 ||  || — || April 24, 2000 || Anderson Mesa || LONEOS || URS || align=right | 5.8 km || 
|-id=105 bgcolor=#d6d6d6
| 165105 ||  || — || April 26, 2000 || Anderson Mesa || LONEOS || TRP || align=right | 4.6 km || 
|-id=106 bgcolor=#d6d6d6
| 165106 ||  || — || April 25, 2000 || Anderson Mesa || LONEOS || — || align=right | 4.6 km || 
|-id=107 bgcolor=#d6d6d6
| 165107 ||  || — || April 26, 2000 || Anderson Mesa || LONEOS || EOS || align=right | 3.4 km || 
|-id=108 bgcolor=#d6d6d6
| 165108 ||  || — || April 27, 2000 || Kitt Peak || Spacewatch || — || align=right | 5.4 km || 
|-id=109 bgcolor=#d6d6d6
| 165109 ||  || — || April 25, 2000 || Anderson Mesa || LONEOS || ALA || align=right | 5.2 km || 
|-id=110 bgcolor=#d6d6d6
| 165110 ||  || — || April 30, 2000 || Anderson Mesa || LONEOS || HYG || align=right | 4.9 km || 
|-id=111 bgcolor=#d6d6d6
| 165111 ||  || — || April 27, 2000 || Anderson Mesa || LONEOS || — || align=right | 5.9 km || 
|-id=112 bgcolor=#d6d6d6
| 165112 ||  || — || April 27, 2000 || Anderson Mesa || LONEOS || TIR || align=right | 4.1 km || 
|-id=113 bgcolor=#d6d6d6
| 165113 ||  || — || May 3, 2000 || Socorro || LINEAR || TIR || align=right | 3.1 km || 
|-id=114 bgcolor=#d6d6d6
| 165114 ||  || — || May 7, 2000 || Socorro || LINEAR || HYG || align=right | 6.8 km || 
|-id=115 bgcolor=#d6d6d6
| 165115 ||  || — || May 7, 2000 || Socorro || LINEAR || MEL || align=right | 8.5 km || 
|-id=116 bgcolor=#d6d6d6
| 165116 ||  || — || May 7, 2000 || Socorro || LINEAR || URS || align=right | 7.2 km || 
|-id=117 bgcolor=#FA8072
| 165117 ||  || — || May 7, 2000 || Socorro || LINEAR || — || align=right | 1.2 km || 
|-id=118 bgcolor=#d6d6d6
| 165118 ||  || — || May 7, 2000 || Kitt Peak || Spacewatch || — || align=right | 5.1 km || 
|-id=119 bgcolor=#d6d6d6
| 165119 ||  || — || May 7, 2000 || Kitt Peak || Spacewatch || — || align=right | 3.3 km || 
|-id=120 bgcolor=#d6d6d6
| 165120 ||  || — || May 1, 2000 || Anderson Mesa || LONEOS || HYG || align=right | 5.2 km || 
|-id=121 bgcolor=#fefefe
| 165121 ||  || — || May 7, 2000 || Socorro || LINEAR || — || align=right | 1.2 km || 
|-id=122 bgcolor=#d6d6d6
| 165122 ||  || — || May 5, 2000 || Socorro || LINEAR || EUP || align=right | 9.4 km || 
|-id=123 bgcolor=#d6d6d6
| 165123 ||  || — || May 27, 2000 || Socorro || LINEAR || — || align=right | 5.1 km || 
|-id=124 bgcolor=#fefefe
| 165124 ||  || — || May 28, 2000 || Socorro || LINEAR || — || align=right data-sort-value="0.81" | 810 m || 
|-id=125 bgcolor=#d6d6d6
| 165125 ||  || — || May 28, 2000 || Socorro || LINEAR || — || align=right | 5.6 km || 
|-id=126 bgcolor=#d6d6d6
| 165126 ||  || — || May 28, 2000 || Socorro || LINEAR || THM || align=right | 4.5 km || 
|-id=127 bgcolor=#d6d6d6
| 165127 ||  || — || May 30, 2000 || Kitt Peak || Spacewatch || — || align=right | 4.9 km || 
|-id=128 bgcolor=#fefefe
| 165128 ||  || — || May 31, 2000 || Kitt Peak || Spacewatch || V || align=right | 1.1 km || 
|-id=129 bgcolor=#d6d6d6
| 165129 ||  || — || May 28, 2000 || Kitt Peak || Spacewatch || EOS || align=right | 3.6 km || 
|-id=130 bgcolor=#d6d6d6
| 165130 ||  || — || May 27, 2000 || Anderson Mesa || LONEOS || — || align=right | 4.7 km || 
|-id=131 bgcolor=#d6d6d6
| 165131 ||  || — || May 24, 2000 || Anderson Mesa || LONEOS || LIX || align=right | 5.6 km || 
|-id=132 bgcolor=#fefefe
| 165132 ||  || — || May 24, 2000 || Anderson Mesa || LONEOS || — || align=right | 1.3 km || 
|-id=133 bgcolor=#d6d6d6
| 165133 ||  || — || May 25, 2000 || Anderson Mesa || LONEOS || — || align=right | 7.7 km || 
|-id=134 bgcolor=#d6d6d6
| 165134 ||  || — || May 27, 2000 || Anderson Mesa || LONEOS || — || align=right | 4.8 km || 
|-id=135 bgcolor=#d6d6d6
| 165135 ||  || — || May 28, 2000 || Socorro || LINEAR || — || align=right | 6.5 km || 
|-id=136 bgcolor=#d6d6d6
| 165136 ||  || — || May 27, 2000 || Socorro || LINEAR || — || align=right | 5.5 km || 
|-id=137 bgcolor=#d6d6d6
| 165137 ||  || — || May 27, 2000 || Socorro || LINEAR || EUP || align=right | 9.9 km || 
|-id=138 bgcolor=#fefefe
| 165138 ||  || — || July 7, 2000 || Socorro || LINEAR || — || align=right | 1.8 km || 
|-id=139 bgcolor=#FA8072
| 165139 ||  || — || July 6, 2000 || Anderson Mesa || LONEOS || — || align=right | 1.4 km || 
|-id=140 bgcolor=#fefefe
| 165140 ||  || — || July 24, 2000 || Kitt Peak || Spacewatch || — || align=right | 1.2 km || 
|-id=141 bgcolor=#fefefe
| 165141 ||  || — || July 23, 2000 || Socorro || LINEAR || FLO || align=right data-sort-value="0.96" | 960 m || 
|-id=142 bgcolor=#fefefe
| 165142 ||  || — || July 30, 2000 || Socorro || LINEAR || — || align=right | 1.4 km || 
|-id=143 bgcolor=#fefefe
| 165143 ||  || — || August 2, 2000 || Socorro || LINEAR || FLO || align=right | 2.4 km || 
|-id=144 bgcolor=#FA8072
| 165144 ||  || — || August 25, 2000 || Socorro || LINEAR || — || align=right | 1.7 km || 
|-id=145 bgcolor=#fefefe
| 165145 ||  || — || August 24, 2000 || Socorro || LINEAR || — || align=right | 1.8 km || 
|-id=146 bgcolor=#fefefe
| 165146 ||  || — || August 24, 2000 || Socorro || LINEAR || — || align=right | 1.5 km || 
|-id=147 bgcolor=#fefefe
| 165147 ||  || — || August 24, 2000 || Socorro || LINEAR || FLO || align=right data-sort-value="0.96" | 960 m || 
|-id=148 bgcolor=#fefefe
| 165148 ||  || — || August 24, 2000 || Socorro || LINEAR || NYS || align=right data-sort-value="0.86" | 860 m || 
|-id=149 bgcolor=#fefefe
| 165149 ||  || — || August 24, 2000 || Socorro || LINEAR || — || align=right | 1.9 km || 
|-id=150 bgcolor=#d6d6d6
| 165150 ||  || — || August 24, 2000 || Socorro || LINEAR || THM || align=right | 4.2 km || 
|-id=151 bgcolor=#fefefe
| 165151 ||  || — || August 26, 2000 || Prescott || P. G. Comba || — || align=right | 1.8 km || 
|-id=152 bgcolor=#fefefe
| 165152 ||  || — || August 24, 2000 || Socorro || LINEAR || — || align=right | 1.6 km || 
|-id=153 bgcolor=#fefefe
| 165153 ||  || — || August 24, 2000 || Socorro || LINEAR || — || align=right | 1.4 km || 
|-id=154 bgcolor=#fefefe
| 165154 ||  || — || August 24, 2000 || Socorro || LINEAR || FLO || align=right data-sort-value="0.92" | 920 m || 
|-id=155 bgcolor=#fefefe
| 165155 ||  || — || August 24, 2000 || Socorro || LINEAR || — || align=right | 1.2 km || 
|-id=156 bgcolor=#fefefe
| 165156 ||  || — || August 24, 2000 || Socorro || LINEAR || — || align=right data-sort-value="0.87" | 870 m || 
|-id=157 bgcolor=#fefefe
| 165157 ||  || — || August 24, 2000 || Socorro || LINEAR || FLO || align=right data-sort-value="0.94" | 940 m || 
|-id=158 bgcolor=#fefefe
| 165158 ||  || — || August 24, 2000 || Socorro || LINEAR || — || align=right | 1.2 km || 
|-id=159 bgcolor=#fefefe
| 165159 ||  || — || August 25, 2000 || Socorro || LINEAR || — || align=right | 1.0 km || 
|-id=160 bgcolor=#fefefe
| 165160 ||  || — || August 28, 2000 || Socorro || LINEAR || — || align=right | 1.4 km || 
|-id=161 bgcolor=#fefefe
| 165161 ||  || — || August 30, 2000 || Kitt Peak || Spacewatch || V || align=right | 1.1 km || 
|-id=162 bgcolor=#fefefe
| 165162 ||  || — || August 30, 2000 || Kitt Peak || Spacewatch || V || align=right data-sort-value="0.94" | 940 m || 
|-id=163 bgcolor=#fefefe
| 165163 ||  || — || August 25, 2000 || Socorro || LINEAR || FLO || align=right data-sort-value="0.89" | 890 m || 
|-id=164 bgcolor=#fefefe
| 165164 ||  || — || August 25, 2000 || Socorro || LINEAR || FLO || align=right | 1.2 km || 
|-id=165 bgcolor=#fefefe
| 165165 ||  || — || August 28, 2000 || Socorro || LINEAR || NYS || align=right data-sort-value="0.97" | 970 m || 
|-id=166 bgcolor=#fefefe
| 165166 ||  || — || August 28, 2000 || Socorro || LINEAR || — || align=right | 1.4 km || 
|-id=167 bgcolor=#fefefe
| 165167 ||  || — || August 28, 2000 || Saji || Saji Obs. || NYS || align=right | 1.2 km || 
|-id=168 bgcolor=#fefefe
| 165168 ||  || — || August 24, 2000 || Socorro || LINEAR || — || align=right | 1.8 km || 
|-id=169 bgcolor=#fefefe
| 165169 ||  || — || August 24, 2000 || Socorro || LINEAR || — || align=right data-sort-value="0.77" | 770 m || 
|-id=170 bgcolor=#fefefe
| 165170 ||  || — || August 24, 2000 || Socorro || LINEAR || — || align=right | 1.4 km || 
|-id=171 bgcolor=#fefefe
| 165171 ||  || — || August 25, 2000 || Socorro || LINEAR || FLO || align=right | 1.9 km || 
|-id=172 bgcolor=#fefefe
| 165172 ||  || — || August 29, 2000 || Socorro || LINEAR || — || align=right | 2.2 km || 
|-id=173 bgcolor=#fefefe
| 165173 ||  || — || August 31, 2000 || Socorro || LINEAR || — || align=right | 1.2 km || 
|-id=174 bgcolor=#fefefe
| 165174 ||  || — || August 28, 2000 || Socorro || LINEAR || FLO || align=right | 1.1 km || 
|-id=175 bgcolor=#fefefe
| 165175 ||  || — || August 29, 2000 || Socorro || LINEAR || FLO || align=right | 1.1 km || 
|-id=176 bgcolor=#fefefe
| 165176 ||  || — || August 31, 2000 || Socorro || LINEAR || V || align=right | 1.0 km || 
|-id=177 bgcolor=#fefefe
| 165177 ||  || — || August 31, 2000 || Socorro || LINEAR || — || align=right | 1.3 km || 
|-id=178 bgcolor=#fefefe
| 165178 ||  || — || August 31, 2000 || Socorro || LINEAR || — || align=right | 1.2 km || 
|-id=179 bgcolor=#fefefe
| 165179 ||  || — || August 31, 2000 || Socorro || LINEAR || V || align=right | 1.2 km || 
|-id=180 bgcolor=#fefefe
| 165180 ||  || — || August 31, 2000 || Socorro || LINEAR || — || align=right | 1.4 km || 
|-id=181 bgcolor=#fefefe
| 165181 ||  || — || August 31, 2000 || Socorro || LINEAR || FLO || align=right | 1.3 km || 
|-id=182 bgcolor=#fefefe
| 165182 ||  || — || August 31, 2000 || Socorro || LINEAR || FLO || align=right | 3.0 km || 
|-id=183 bgcolor=#fefefe
| 165183 ||  || — || August 26, 2000 || Socorro || LINEAR || — || align=right | 1.4 km || 
|-id=184 bgcolor=#fefefe
| 165184 ||  || — || August 31, 2000 || Socorro || LINEAR || — || align=right | 1.6 km || 
|-id=185 bgcolor=#fefefe
| 165185 ||  || — || August 31, 2000 || Socorro || LINEAR || — || align=right | 1.3 km || 
|-id=186 bgcolor=#fefefe
| 165186 ||  || — || August 31, 2000 || Socorro || LINEAR || — || align=right | 2.5 km || 
|-id=187 bgcolor=#fefefe
| 165187 ||  || — || August 31, 2000 || Socorro || LINEAR || — || align=right | 1.4 km || 
|-id=188 bgcolor=#d6d6d6
| 165188 ||  || — || August 31, 2000 || Socorro || LINEAR || HIL3:2 || align=right | 7.9 km || 
|-id=189 bgcolor=#fefefe
| 165189 ||  || — || August 21, 2000 || Anderson Mesa || LONEOS || — || align=right | 1.5 km || 
|-id=190 bgcolor=#fefefe
| 165190 ||  || — || August 21, 2000 || Anderson Mesa || LONEOS || — || align=right | 1.3 km || 
|-id=191 bgcolor=#fefefe
| 165191 ||  || — || August 29, 2000 || Socorro || LINEAR || FLO || align=right data-sort-value="0.99" | 990 m || 
|-id=192 bgcolor=#fefefe
| 165192 Neugent ||  ||  || August 26, 2000 || Cerro Tololo || L. H. Wasserman || FLO || align=right | 1.2 km || 
|-id=193 bgcolor=#fefefe
| 165193 ||  || — || August 21, 2000 || Anderson Mesa || LONEOS || — || align=right | 1.00 km || 
|-id=194 bgcolor=#fefefe
| 165194 ||  || — || September 1, 2000 || Socorro || LINEAR || — || align=right | 1.1 km || 
|-id=195 bgcolor=#fefefe
| 165195 ||  || — || September 1, 2000 || Socorro || LINEAR || — || align=right | 1.6 km || 
|-id=196 bgcolor=#fefefe
| 165196 ||  || — || September 1, 2000 || Socorro || LINEAR || FLO || align=right | 1.4 km || 
|-id=197 bgcolor=#fefefe
| 165197 ||  || — || September 1, 2000 || Socorro || LINEAR || — || align=right | 1.9 km || 
|-id=198 bgcolor=#fefefe
| 165198 ||  || — || September 1, 2000 || Socorro || LINEAR || FLO || align=right data-sort-value="0.97" | 970 m || 
|-id=199 bgcolor=#fefefe
| 165199 ||  || — || September 3, 2000 || Socorro || LINEAR || — || align=right | 1.8 km || 
|-id=200 bgcolor=#fefefe
| 165200 ||  || — || September 5, 2000 || Socorro || LINEAR || — || align=right | 1.2 km || 
|}

165201–165300 

|-bgcolor=#fefefe
| 165201 ||  || — || September 7, 2000 || Kitt Peak || Spacewatch || — || align=right | 1.3 km || 
|-id=202 bgcolor=#fefefe
| 165202 ||  || — || September 1, 2000 || Socorro || LINEAR || — || align=right | 1.6 km || 
|-id=203 bgcolor=#fefefe
| 165203 ||  || — || September 2, 2000 || Socorro || LINEAR || V || align=right | 1.2 km || 
|-id=204 bgcolor=#fefefe
| 165204 ||  || — || September 2, 2000 || Socorro || LINEAR || — || align=right | 1.5 km || 
|-id=205 bgcolor=#fefefe
| 165205 ||  || — || September 4, 2000 || Socorro || LINEAR || — || align=right | 2.0 km || 
|-id=206 bgcolor=#fefefe
| 165206 ||  || — || September 2, 2000 || Socorro || LINEAR || FLO || align=right data-sort-value="0.93" | 930 m || 
|-id=207 bgcolor=#fefefe
| 165207 ||  || — || September 4, 2000 || Anderson Mesa || LONEOS || — || align=right | 1.2 km || 
|-id=208 bgcolor=#fefefe
| 165208 ||  || — || September 4, 2000 || Anderson Mesa || LONEOS || — || align=right | 1.3 km || 
|-id=209 bgcolor=#fefefe
| 165209 ||  || — || September 5, 2000 || Anderson Mesa || LONEOS || PHO || align=right | 1.9 km || 
|-id=210 bgcolor=#fefefe
| 165210 ||  || — || September 21, 2000 || Socorro || LINEAR || V || align=right | 1.2 km || 
|-id=211 bgcolor=#fefefe
| 165211 ||  || — || September 22, 2000 || Kitt Peak || Spacewatch || V || align=right | 1.2 km || 
|-id=212 bgcolor=#fefefe
| 165212 ||  || — || September 23, 2000 || Socorro || LINEAR || — || align=right | 1.5 km || 
|-id=213 bgcolor=#FA8072
| 165213 ||  || — || September 20, 2000 || Socorro || LINEAR || — || align=right | 1.3 km || 
|-id=214 bgcolor=#fefefe
| 165214 ||  || — || September 24, 2000 || Socorro || LINEAR || FLO || align=right | 1.0 km || 
|-id=215 bgcolor=#fefefe
| 165215 ||  || — || September 24, 2000 || Socorro || LINEAR || — || align=right | 1.5 km || 
|-id=216 bgcolor=#fefefe
| 165216 ||  || — || September 24, 2000 || Socorro || LINEAR || — || align=right | 1.2 km || 
|-id=217 bgcolor=#fefefe
| 165217 ||  || — || September 24, 2000 || Socorro || LINEAR || — || align=right | 1.4 km || 
|-id=218 bgcolor=#fefefe
| 165218 ||  || — || September 24, 2000 || Socorro || LINEAR || FLO || align=right | 1.3 km || 
|-id=219 bgcolor=#fefefe
| 165219 ||  || — || September 24, 2000 || Socorro || LINEAR || FLO || align=right | 1.2 km || 
|-id=220 bgcolor=#fefefe
| 165220 ||  || — || September 24, 2000 || Socorro || LINEAR || NYS || align=right data-sort-value="0.96" | 960 m || 
|-id=221 bgcolor=#fefefe
| 165221 ||  || — || September 27, 2000 || Socorro || LINEAR || — || align=right | 4.6 km || 
|-id=222 bgcolor=#FA8072
| 165222 ||  || — || September 26, 2000 || Haleakala || NEAT || — || align=right | 1.8 km || 
|-id=223 bgcolor=#fefefe
| 165223 ||  || — || September 23, 2000 || Socorro || LINEAR || FLO || align=right | 1.1 km || 
|-id=224 bgcolor=#fefefe
| 165224 ||  || — || September 23, 2000 || Socorro || LINEAR || FLO || align=right | 1.1 km || 
|-id=225 bgcolor=#fefefe
| 165225 ||  || — || September 24, 2000 || Socorro || LINEAR || — || align=right | 1.4 km || 
|-id=226 bgcolor=#fefefe
| 165226 ||  || — || September 24, 2000 || Socorro || LINEAR || — || align=right | 1.3 km || 
|-id=227 bgcolor=#fefefe
| 165227 ||  || — || September 24, 2000 || Socorro || LINEAR || — || align=right | 1.3 km || 
|-id=228 bgcolor=#fefefe
| 165228 ||  || — || September 24, 2000 || Socorro || LINEAR || FLO || align=right data-sort-value="0.98" | 980 m || 
|-id=229 bgcolor=#fefefe
| 165229 ||  || — || September 24, 2000 || Socorro || LINEAR || — || align=right | 1.3 km || 
|-id=230 bgcolor=#fefefe
| 165230 ||  || — || September 24, 2000 || Socorro || LINEAR || V || align=right | 1.2 km || 
|-id=231 bgcolor=#fefefe
| 165231 ||  || — || September 23, 2000 || Socorro || LINEAR || — || align=right | 1.3 km || 
|-id=232 bgcolor=#fefefe
| 165232 ||  || — || September 24, 2000 || Socorro || LINEAR || — || align=right | 1.3 km || 
|-id=233 bgcolor=#d6d6d6
| 165233 ||  || — || September 24, 2000 || Socorro || LINEAR || SYL7:4 || align=right | 9.7 km || 
|-id=234 bgcolor=#fefefe
| 165234 ||  || — || September 24, 2000 || Socorro || LINEAR || — || align=right | 1.6 km || 
|-id=235 bgcolor=#fefefe
| 165235 ||  || — || September 24, 2000 || Socorro || LINEAR || — || align=right | 1.2 km || 
|-id=236 bgcolor=#fefefe
| 165236 ||  || — || September 24, 2000 || Socorro || LINEAR || V || align=right | 1.3 km || 
|-id=237 bgcolor=#fefefe
| 165237 ||  || — || September 24, 2000 || Socorro || LINEAR || V || align=right | 1.1 km || 
|-id=238 bgcolor=#fefefe
| 165238 ||  || — || September 24, 2000 || Socorro || LINEAR || V || align=right | 1.2 km || 
|-id=239 bgcolor=#fefefe
| 165239 ||  || — || September 24, 2000 || Socorro || LINEAR || NYS || align=right | 1.1 km || 
|-id=240 bgcolor=#fefefe
| 165240 ||  || — || September 24, 2000 || Socorro || LINEAR || — || align=right | 1.6 km || 
|-id=241 bgcolor=#fefefe
| 165241 ||  || — || September 23, 2000 || Socorro || LINEAR || — || align=right | 1.8 km || 
|-id=242 bgcolor=#fefefe
| 165242 ||  || — || September 23, 2000 || Socorro || LINEAR || FLO || align=right | 1.4 km || 
|-id=243 bgcolor=#fefefe
| 165243 ||  || — || September 24, 2000 || Socorro || LINEAR || NYS || align=right | 1.1 km || 
|-id=244 bgcolor=#fefefe
| 165244 ||  || — || September 24, 2000 || Socorro || LINEAR || NYS || align=right | 1.1 km || 
|-id=245 bgcolor=#fefefe
| 165245 ||  || — || September 24, 2000 || Socorro || LINEAR || — || align=right | 1.1 km || 
|-id=246 bgcolor=#fefefe
| 165246 ||  || — || September 24, 2000 || Socorro || LINEAR || V || align=right | 1.3 km || 
|-id=247 bgcolor=#fefefe
| 165247 ||  || — || September 24, 2000 || Socorro || LINEAR || V || align=right | 1.1 km || 
|-id=248 bgcolor=#fefefe
| 165248 ||  || — || September 24, 2000 || Socorro || LINEAR || NYS || align=right | 1.0 km || 
|-id=249 bgcolor=#fefefe
| 165249 ||  || — || September 24, 2000 || Socorro || LINEAR || V || align=right | 1.0 km || 
|-id=250 bgcolor=#fefefe
| 165250 ||  || — || September 27, 2000 || Socorro || LINEAR || FLO || align=right | 1.1 km || 
|-id=251 bgcolor=#fefefe
| 165251 ||  || — || September 28, 2000 || Socorro || LINEAR || V || align=right | 1.2 km || 
|-id=252 bgcolor=#fefefe
| 165252 ||  || — || September 20, 2000 || Kitt Peak || Spacewatch || — || align=right | 2.3 km || 
|-id=253 bgcolor=#fefefe
| 165253 ||  || — || September 24, 2000 || Socorro || LINEAR || — || align=right data-sort-value="0.88" | 880 m || 
|-id=254 bgcolor=#fefefe
| 165254 ||  || — || September 24, 2000 || Socorro || LINEAR || — || align=right | 1.1 km || 
|-id=255 bgcolor=#fefefe
| 165255 ||  || — || September 24, 2000 || Socorro || LINEAR || — || align=right | 1.0 km || 
|-id=256 bgcolor=#fefefe
| 165256 ||  || — || September 24, 2000 || Socorro || LINEAR || — || align=right | 1.7 km || 
|-id=257 bgcolor=#fefefe
| 165257 ||  || — || September 24, 2000 || Socorro || LINEAR || V || align=right | 1.3 km || 
|-id=258 bgcolor=#fefefe
| 165258 ||  || — || September 25, 2000 || Socorro || LINEAR || — || align=right | 1.8 km || 
|-id=259 bgcolor=#fefefe
| 165259 ||  || — || September 26, 2000 || Socorro || LINEAR || — || align=right | 1.5 km || 
|-id=260 bgcolor=#fefefe
| 165260 ||  || — || September 26, 2000 || Socorro || LINEAR || V || align=right | 1.1 km || 
|-id=261 bgcolor=#fefefe
| 165261 ||  || — || September 27, 2000 || Socorro || LINEAR || — || align=right | 1.5 km || 
|-id=262 bgcolor=#fefefe
| 165262 ||  || — || September 28, 2000 || Socorro || LINEAR || FLO || align=right data-sort-value="0.83" | 830 m || 
|-id=263 bgcolor=#fefefe
| 165263 ||  || — || September 28, 2000 || Socorro || LINEAR || — || align=right | 1.2 km || 
|-id=264 bgcolor=#fefefe
| 165264 ||  || — || September 24, 2000 || Socorro || LINEAR || NYS || align=right | 1.0 km || 
|-id=265 bgcolor=#fefefe
| 165265 ||  || — || September 24, 2000 || Socorro || LINEAR || — || align=right | 1.7 km || 
|-id=266 bgcolor=#fefefe
| 165266 ||  || — || September 27, 2000 || Socorro || LINEAR || PHO || align=right | 2.3 km || 
|-id=267 bgcolor=#fefefe
| 165267 ||  || — || September 24, 2000 || Socorro || LINEAR || FLO || align=right | 1.4 km || 
|-id=268 bgcolor=#fefefe
| 165268 ||  || — || September 24, 2000 || Socorro || LINEAR || — || align=right | 3.1 km || 
|-id=269 bgcolor=#fefefe
| 165269 ||  || — || September 24, 2000 || Socorro || LINEAR || — || align=right | 1.1 km || 
|-id=270 bgcolor=#fefefe
| 165270 ||  || — || September 24, 2000 || Socorro || LINEAR || — || align=right | 1.5 km || 
|-id=271 bgcolor=#fefefe
| 165271 ||  || — || September 24, 2000 || Socorro || LINEAR || — || align=right | 1.8 km || 
|-id=272 bgcolor=#fefefe
| 165272 ||  || — || September 26, 2000 || Socorro || LINEAR || NYS || align=right data-sort-value="0.98" | 980 m || 
|-id=273 bgcolor=#fefefe
| 165273 ||  || — || September 27, 2000 || Socorro || LINEAR || — || align=right | 1.5 km || 
|-id=274 bgcolor=#fefefe
| 165274 ||  || — || September 27, 2000 || Socorro || LINEAR || V || align=right | 1.2 km || 
|-id=275 bgcolor=#fefefe
| 165275 ||  || — || September 28, 2000 || Socorro || LINEAR || ERI || align=right | 2.9 km || 
|-id=276 bgcolor=#fefefe
| 165276 ||  || — || September 30, 2000 || Socorro || LINEAR || — || align=right | 1.7 km || 
|-id=277 bgcolor=#fefefe
| 165277 ||  || — || September 28, 2000 || Socorro || LINEAR || — || align=right | 1.5 km || 
|-id=278 bgcolor=#fefefe
| 165278 ||  || — || September 28, 2000 || Socorro || LINEAR || — || align=right | 1.5 km || 
|-id=279 bgcolor=#fefefe
| 165279 ||  || — || September 30, 2000 || Socorro || LINEAR || V || align=right | 1.3 km || 
|-id=280 bgcolor=#fefefe
| 165280 ||  || — || September 30, 2000 || Socorro || LINEAR || V || align=right | 1.2 km || 
|-id=281 bgcolor=#fefefe
| 165281 ||  || — || September 29, 2000 || Kitt Peak || Spacewatch || — || align=right | 1.3 km || 
|-id=282 bgcolor=#fefefe
| 165282 ||  || — || September 29, 2000 || Kitt Peak || Spacewatch || NYS || align=right | 1.0 km || 
|-id=283 bgcolor=#fefefe
| 165283 ||  || — || September 30, 2000 || Socorro || LINEAR || — || align=right | 1.7 km || 
|-id=284 bgcolor=#fefefe
| 165284 ||  || — || September 24, 2000 || Socorro || LINEAR || V || align=right | 1.3 km || 
|-id=285 bgcolor=#fefefe
| 165285 ||  || — || September 24, 2000 || Kitt Peak || Spacewatch || MAS || align=right data-sort-value="0.87" | 870 m || 
|-id=286 bgcolor=#fefefe
| 165286 ||  || — || September 23, 2000 || Socorro || LINEAR || — || align=right | 3.4 km || 
|-id=287 bgcolor=#fefefe
| 165287 ||  || — || September 30, 2000 || Anderson Mesa || LONEOS || — || align=right | 1.4 km || 
|-id=288 bgcolor=#fefefe
| 165288 ||  || — || September 29, 2000 || Anderson Mesa || LONEOS || V || align=right | 1.0 km || 
|-id=289 bgcolor=#fefefe
| 165289 ||  || — || September 29, 2000 || Anderson Mesa || LONEOS || — || align=right | 1.5 km || 
|-id=290 bgcolor=#fefefe
| 165290 ||  || — || September 23, 2000 || Anderson Mesa || LONEOS || — || align=right | 1.2 km || 
|-id=291 bgcolor=#fefefe
| 165291 ||  || — || September 21, 2000 || Anderson Mesa || LONEOS || FLO || align=right data-sort-value="0.80" | 800 m || 
|-id=292 bgcolor=#fefefe
| 165292 ||  || — || September 24, 2000 || Socorro || LINEAR || FLO || align=right data-sort-value="0.85" | 850 m || 
|-id=293 bgcolor=#fefefe
| 165293 ||  || — || October 1, 2000 || Socorro || LINEAR || — || align=right | 1.5 km || 
|-id=294 bgcolor=#fefefe
| 165294 ||  || — || October 1, 2000 || Socorro || LINEAR || — || align=right | 1.0 km || 
|-id=295 bgcolor=#fefefe
| 165295 ||  || — || October 1, 2000 || Socorro || LINEAR || NYS || align=right | 1.1 km || 
|-id=296 bgcolor=#fefefe
| 165296 ||  || — || October 1, 2000 || Socorro || LINEAR || FLO || align=right | 1.1 km || 
|-id=297 bgcolor=#fefefe
| 165297 ||  || — || October 6, 2000 || Anderson Mesa || LONEOS || — || align=right | 1.5 km || 
|-id=298 bgcolor=#fefefe
| 165298 ||  || — || October 1, 2000 || Socorro || LINEAR || — || align=right | 1.5 km || 
|-id=299 bgcolor=#fefefe
| 165299 ||  || — || October 1, 2000 || Anderson Mesa || LONEOS || — || align=right | 1.3 km || 
|-id=300 bgcolor=#fefefe
| 165300 ||  || — || October 2, 2000 || Socorro || LINEAR || — || align=right | 1.2 km || 
|}

165301–165400 

|-bgcolor=#fefefe
| 165301 ||  || — || October 24, 2000 || Socorro || LINEAR || — || align=right | 1.4 km || 
|-id=302 bgcolor=#fefefe
| 165302 ||  || — || October 24, 2000 || Socorro || LINEAR || — || align=right | 2.0 km || 
|-id=303 bgcolor=#fefefe
| 165303 ||  || — || October 24, 2000 || Socorro || LINEAR || NYS || align=right | 2.9 km || 
|-id=304 bgcolor=#fefefe
| 165304 ||  || — || October 24, 2000 || Socorro || LINEAR || NYS || align=right data-sort-value="0.98" | 980 m || 
|-id=305 bgcolor=#fefefe
| 165305 ||  || — || October 24, 2000 || Socorro || LINEAR || NYS || align=right | 1.0 km || 
|-id=306 bgcolor=#d6d6d6
| 165306 ||  || — || October 24, 2000 || Socorro || LINEAR || HIL3:2 || align=right | 5.5 km || 
|-id=307 bgcolor=#fefefe
| 165307 ||  || — || October 24, 2000 || Socorro || LINEAR || NYS || align=right | 1.1 km || 
|-id=308 bgcolor=#fefefe
| 165308 ||  || — || October 24, 2000 || Socorro || LINEAR || FLO || align=right | 1.2 km || 
|-id=309 bgcolor=#fefefe
| 165309 ||  || — || October 30, 2000 || Socorro || LINEAR || — || align=right | 1.3 km || 
|-id=310 bgcolor=#fefefe
| 165310 ||  || — || October 24, 2000 || Socorro || LINEAR || — || align=right | 1.2 km || 
|-id=311 bgcolor=#fefefe
| 165311 ||  || — || October 24, 2000 || Socorro || LINEAR || — || align=right | 1.3 km || 
|-id=312 bgcolor=#fefefe
| 165312 ||  || — || October 24, 2000 || Socorro || LINEAR || — || align=right | 1.1 km || 
|-id=313 bgcolor=#fefefe
| 165313 ||  || — || October 24, 2000 || Socorro || LINEAR || — || align=right | 1.7 km || 
|-id=314 bgcolor=#fefefe
| 165314 ||  || — || October 25, 2000 || Socorro || LINEAR || NYS || align=right | 2.6 km || 
|-id=315 bgcolor=#fefefe
| 165315 ||  || — || October 25, 2000 || Socorro || LINEAR || — || align=right | 1.5 km || 
|-id=316 bgcolor=#fefefe
| 165316 ||  || — || October 25, 2000 || Socorro || LINEAR || — || align=right | 1.7 km || 
|-id=317 bgcolor=#fefefe
| 165317 ||  || — || October 25, 2000 || Socorro || LINEAR || NYS || align=right | 1.2 km || 
|-id=318 bgcolor=#fefefe
| 165318 ||  || — || October 25, 2000 || Socorro || LINEAR || NYS || align=right | 1.3 km || 
|-id=319 bgcolor=#fefefe
| 165319 ||  || — || October 25, 2000 || Socorro || LINEAR || — || align=right | 2.5 km || 
|-id=320 bgcolor=#fefefe
| 165320 ||  || — || October 25, 2000 || Socorro || LINEAR || — || align=right | 1.5 km || 
|-id=321 bgcolor=#fefefe
| 165321 ||  || — || October 27, 2000 || Socorro || LINEAR || NYS || align=right data-sort-value="0.96" | 960 m || 
|-id=322 bgcolor=#fefefe
| 165322 ||  || — || October 24, 2000 || Socorro || LINEAR || NYS || align=right | 1.1 km || 
|-id=323 bgcolor=#fefefe
| 165323 ||  || — || October 24, 2000 || Socorro || LINEAR || CHL || align=right | 2.9 km || 
|-id=324 bgcolor=#fefefe
| 165324 ||  || — || October 24, 2000 || Socorro || LINEAR || V || align=right | 1.1 km || 
|-id=325 bgcolor=#fefefe
| 165325 ||  || — || October 31, 2000 || Socorro || LINEAR || NYS || align=right | 1.1 km || 
|-id=326 bgcolor=#fefefe
| 165326 ||  || — || October 25, 2000 || Socorro || LINEAR || V || align=right | 1.00 km || 
|-id=327 bgcolor=#fefefe
| 165327 ||  || — || October 25, 2000 || Socorro || LINEAR || — || align=right | 1.0 km || 
|-id=328 bgcolor=#fefefe
| 165328 ||  || — || October 25, 2000 || Socorro || LINEAR || FLO || align=right | 1.3 km || 
|-id=329 bgcolor=#fefefe
| 165329 ||  || — || October 25, 2000 || Socorro || LINEAR || — || align=right | 1.3 km || 
|-id=330 bgcolor=#fefefe
| 165330 ||  || — || October 29, 2000 || Socorro || LINEAR || V || align=right | 1.2 km || 
|-id=331 bgcolor=#fefefe
| 165331 ||  || — || October 30, 2000 || Socorro || LINEAR || — || align=right | 1.3 km || 
|-id=332 bgcolor=#fefefe
| 165332 || 2000 VS || — || November 1, 2000 || Kitt Peak || Spacewatch || NYS || align=right | 2.3 km || 
|-id=333 bgcolor=#fefefe
| 165333 ||  || — || November 1, 2000 || Socorro || LINEAR || — || align=right | 1.3 km || 
|-id=334 bgcolor=#fefefe
| 165334 ||  || — || November 1, 2000 || Socorro || LINEAR || — || align=right | 1.4 km || 
|-id=335 bgcolor=#fefefe
| 165335 ||  || — || November 1, 2000 || Socorro || LINEAR || — || align=right | 1.7 km || 
|-id=336 bgcolor=#fefefe
| 165336 ||  || — || November 1, 2000 || Socorro || LINEAR || — || align=right | 1.4 km || 
|-id=337 bgcolor=#fefefe
| 165337 ||  || — || November 1, 2000 || Socorro || LINEAR || V || align=right | 1.0 km || 
|-id=338 bgcolor=#fefefe
| 165338 ||  || — || November 1, 2000 || Socorro || LINEAR || NYS || align=right | 1.1 km || 
|-id=339 bgcolor=#fefefe
| 165339 ||  || — || November 1, 2000 || Socorro || LINEAR || V || align=right | 1.2 km || 
|-id=340 bgcolor=#fefefe
| 165340 ||  || — || November 1, 2000 || Socorro || LINEAR || MAS || align=right | 1.4 km || 
|-id=341 bgcolor=#fefefe
| 165341 ||  || — || November 1, 2000 || Socorro || LINEAR || — || align=right | 1.9 km || 
|-id=342 bgcolor=#fefefe
| 165342 ||  || — || November 1, 2000 || Socorro || LINEAR || MAS || align=right | 1.3 km || 
|-id=343 bgcolor=#fefefe
| 165343 ||  || — || November 1, 2000 || Socorro || LINEAR || — || align=right | 2.3 km || 
|-id=344 bgcolor=#fefefe
| 165344 ||  || — || November 3, 2000 || Socorro || LINEAR || ERI || align=right | 2.4 km || 
|-id=345 bgcolor=#fefefe
| 165345 ||  || — || November 3, 2000 || Socorro || LINEAR || V || align=right | 1.3 km || 
|-id=346 bgcolor=#fefefe
| 165346 ||  || — || November 3, 2000 || Socorro || LINEAR || V || align=right | 1.0 km || 
|-id=347 bgcolor=#fefefe
| 165347 Philplait ||  ||  || November 23, 2000 || Junk Bond || J. Medkeff || NYS || align=right | 1.1 km || 
|-id=348 bgcolor=#fefefe
| 165348 ||  || — || November 20, 2000 || Socorro || LINEAR || NYS || align=right data-sort-value="0.93" | 930 m || 
|-id=349 bgcolor=#fefefe
| 165349 ||  || — || November 21, 2000 || Socorro || LINEAR || — || align=right | 1.3 km || 
|-id=350 bgcolor=#fefefe
| 165350 ||  || — || November 21, 2000 || Socorro || LINEAR || MAS || align=right | 1.1 km || 
|-id=351 bgcolor=#fefefe
| 165351 ||  || — || November 20, 2000 || Socorro || LINEAR || — || align=right | 2.0 km || 
|-id=352 bgcolor=#fefefe
| 165352 ||  || — || November 25, 2000 || Socorro || LINEAR || NYS || align=right data-sort-value="0.84" | 840 m || 
|-id=353 bgcolor=#fefefe
| 165353 ||  || — || November 21, 2000 || Socorro || LINEAR || — || align=right | 2.3 km || 
|-id=354 bgcolor=#fefefe
| 165354 ||  || — || November 21, 2000 || Socorro || LINEAR || — || align=right | 1.9 km || 
|-id=355 bgcolor=#fefefe
| 165355 ||  || — || November 21, 2000 || Socorro || LINEAR || — || align=right | 2.2 km || 
|-id=356 bgcolor=#fefefe
| 165356 ||  || — || November 19, 2000 || Socorro || LINEAR || V || align=right | 1.2 km || 
|-id=357 bgcolor=#fefefe
| 165357 ||  || — || November 20, 2000 || Socorro || LINEAR || ERI || align=right | 2.7 km || 
|-id=358 bgcolor=#fefefe
| 165358 ||  || — || November 20, 2000 || Socorro || LINEAR || — || align=right | 1.2 km || 
|-id=359 bgcolor=#fefefe
| 165359 ||  || — || November 20, 2000 || Socorro || LINEAR || — || align=right | 1.3 km || 
|-id=360 bgcolor=#fefefe
| 165360 ||  || — || November 20, 2000 || Socorro || LINEAR || — || align=right | 1.6 km || 
|-id=361 bgcolor=#fefefe
| 165361 ||  || — || November 20, 2000 || Socorro || LINEAR || — || align=right | 5.0 km || 
|-id=362 bgcolor=#fefefe
| 165362 ||  || — || November 21, 2000 || Socorro || LINEAR || — || align=right | 1.4 km || 
|-id=363 bgcolor=#fefefe
| 165363 ||  || — || November 21, 2000 || Socorro || LINEAR || — || align=right | 1.5 km || 
|-id=364 bgcolor=#fefefe
| 165364 ||  || — || November 21, 2000 || Socorro || LINEAR || EUT || align=right | 1.1 km || 
|-id=365 bgcolor=#fefefe
| 165365 ||  || — || November 26, 2000 || Socorro || LINEAR || — || align=right | 1.6 km || 
|-id=366 bgcolor=#fefefe
| 165366 ||  || — || November 27, 2000 || Socorro || LINEAR || ERI || align=right | 3.0 km || 
|-id=367 bgcolor=#fefefe
| 165367 ||  || — || November 25, 2000 || Kitt Peak || Spacewatch || — || align=right | 1.3 km || 
|-id=368 bgcolor=#fefefe
| 165368 ||  || — || November 27, 2000 || Kitt Peak || Spacewatch || MAS || align=right data-sort-value="0.93" | 930 m || 
|-id=369 bgcolor=#fefefe
| 165369 ||  || — || November 28, 2000 || Haleakala || NEAT || PHO || align=right | 2.1 km || 
|-id=370 bgcolor=#fefefe
| 165370 ||  || — || November 20, 2000 || Socorro || LINEAR || — || align=right | 1.7 km || 
|-id=371 bgcolor=#fefefe
| 165371 ||  || — || November 20, 2000 || Socorro || LINEAR || V || align=right | 1.1 km || 
|-id=372 bgcolor=#fefefe
| 165372 ||  || — || November 20, 2000 || Socorro || LINEAR || — || align=right | 1.5 km || 
|-id=373 bgcolor=#fefefe
| 165373 ||  || — || November 20, 2000 || Socorro || LINEAR || — || align=right | 1.7 km || 
|-id=374 bgcolor=#fefefe
| 165374 ||  || — || November 20, 2000 || Socorro || LINEAR || NYS || align=right | 1.2 km || 
|-id=375 bgcolor=#fefefe
| 165375 ||  || — || November 20, 2000 || Socorro || LINEAR || — || align=right | 1.3 km || 
|-id=376 bgcolor=#fefefe
| 165376 ||  || — || November 20, 2000 || Socorro || LINEAR || NYS || align=right | 1.0 km || 
|-id=377 bgcolor=#fefefe
| 165377 ||  || — || November 20, 2000 || Socorro || LINEAR || V || align=right | 1.2 km || 
|-id=378 bgcolor=#fefefe
| 165378 ||  || — || November 21, 2000 || Socorro || LINEAR || NYS || align=right | 1.2 km || 
|-id=379 bgcolor=#fefefe
| 165379 ||  || — || November 21, 2000 || Socorro || LINEAR || — || align=right | 3.1 km || 
|-id=380 bgcolor=#fefefe
| 165380 ||  || — || November 23, 2000 || Haleakala || NEAT || PHO || align=right | 2.0 km || 
|-id=381 bgcolor=#fefefe
| 165381 ||  || — || November 30, 2000 || Socorro || LINEAR || V || align=right | 1.1 km || 
|-id=382 bgcolor=#fefefe
| 165382 ||  || — || November 30, 2000 || Socorro || LINEAR || V || align=right | 1.0 km || 
|-id=383 bgcolor=#FA8072
| 165383 ||  || — || November 25, 2000 || Anderson Mesa || LONEOS || PHO || align=right | 2.2 km || 
|-id=384 bgcolor=#fefefe
| 165384 ||  || — || November 26, 2000 || Kitt Peak || Spacewatch || MAS || align=right data-sort-value="0.97" | 970 m || 
|-id=385 bgcolor=#fefefe
| 165385 ||  || — || November 27, 2000 || Socorro || LINEAR || — || align=right | 1.5 km || 
|-id=386 bgcolor=#fefefe
| 165386 ||  || — || November 28, 2000 || Kitt Peak || Spacewatch || — || align=right | 1.5 km || 
|-id=387 bgcolor=#fefefe
| 165387 ||  || — || November 18, 2000 || Anderson Mesa || LONEOS || FLO || align=right | 1.3 km || 
|-id=388 bgcolor=#fefefe
| 165388 ||  || — || November 16, 2000 || Anderson Mesa || LONEOS || V || align=right | 1.0 km || 
|-id=389 bgcolor=#fefefe
| 165389 ||  || — || November 16, 2000 || Anderson Mesa || LONEOS || V || align=right | 1.0 km || 
|-id=390 bgcolor=#fefefe
| 165390 ||  || — || December 1, 2000 || Bohyunsan || Bohyunsan Obs. || — || align=right | 1.7 km || 
|-id=391 bgcolor=#fefefe
| 165391 ||  || — || December 1, 2000 || Socorro || LINEAR || — || align=right | 1.6 km || 
|-id=392 bgcolor=#fefefe
| 165392 ||  || — || December 1, 2000 || Socorro || LINEAR || — || align=right | 1.7 km || 
|-id=393 bgcolor=#fefefe
| 165393 ||  || — || December 4, 2000 || Socorro || LINEAR || — || align=right | 1.7 km || 
|-id=394 bgcolor=#FA8072
| 165394 ||  || — || December 5, 2000 || Socorro || LINEAR || PHO || align=right | 2.6 km || 
|-id=395 bgcolor=#fefefe
| 165395 ||  || — || December 1, 2000 || Socorro || LINEAR || — || align=right | 1.7 km || 
|-id=396 bgcolor=#fefefe
| 165396 ||  || — || December 1, 2000 || Socorro || LINEAR || — || align=right | 2.0 km || 
|-id=397 bgcolor=#fefefe
| 165397 ||  || — || December 4, 2000 || Socorro || LINEAR || — || align=right | 1.3 km || 
|-id=398 bgcolor=#fefefe
| 165398 ||  || — || December 4, 2000 || Socorro || LINEAR || V || align=right | 1.1 km || 
|-id=399 bgcolor=#fefefe
| 165399 ||  || — || December 4, 2000 || Socorro || LINEAR || — || align=right | 1.4 km || 
|-id=400 bgcolor=#fefefe
| 165400 ||  || — || December 4, 2000 || Socorro || LINEAR || V || align=right | 1.1 km || 
|}

165401–165500 

|-bgcolor=#fefefe
| 165401 ||  || — || December 4, 2000 || Socorro || LINEAR || ERI || align=right | 2.8 km || 
|-id=402 bgcolor=#fefefe
| 165402 ||  || — || December 4, 2000 || Socorro || LINEAR || — || align=right | 3.8 km || 
|-id=403 bgcolor=#fefefe
| 165403 ||  || — || December 5, 2000 || Socorro || LINEAR || SVE || align=right | 4.2 km || 
|-id=404 bgcolor=#fefefe
| 165404 ||  || — || December 8, 2000 || Socorro || LINEAR || PHO || align=right | 3.0 km || 
|-id=405 bgcolor=#fefefe
| 165405 ||  || — || December 4, 2000 || Socorro || LINEAR || V || align=right | 1.1 km || 
|-id=406 bgcolor=#fefefe
| 165406 ||  || — || December 14, 2000 || Bohyunsan || Y.-B. Jeon, B.-C. Lee || MAS || align=right | 1.0 km || 
|-id=407 bgcolor=#fefefe
| 165407 ||  || — || December 20, 2000 || Socorro || LINEAR || — || align=right | 2.0 km || 
|-id=408 bgcolor=#fefefe
| 165408 ||  || — || December 22, 2000 || Socorro || LINEAR || — || align=right | 1.5 km || 
|-id=409 bgcolor=#fefefe
| 165409 ||  || — || December 26, 2000 || Kitt Peak || Spacewatch || NYS || align=right | 1.1 km || 
|-id=410 bgcolor=#fefefe
| 165410 ||  || — || December 26, 2000 || Kitt Peak || Spacewatch || NYS || align=right | 1.1 km || 
|-id=411 bgcolor=#fefefe
| 165411 ||  || — || December 27, 2000 || Kitt Peak || Spacewatch || — || align=right | 1.6 km || 
|-id=412 bgcolor=#fefefe
| 165412 ||  || — || December 28, 2000 || Kitt Peak || Spacewatch || NYS || align=right | 1.4 km || 
|-id=413 bgcolor=#fefefe
| 165413 ||  || — || December 29, 2000 || Haleakala || NEAT || V || align=right | 1.6 km || 
|-id=414 bgcolor=#E9E9E9
| 165414 ||  || — || December 26, 2000 || Kitt Peak || Spacewatch || — || align=right | 4.0 km || 
|-id=415 bgcolor=#fefefe
| 165415 ||  || — || December 30, 2000 || Socorro || LINEAR || — || align=right | 1.5 km || 
|-id=416 bgcolor=#fefefe
| 165416 ||  || — || December 30, 2000 || Socorro || LINEAR || NYS || align=right | 1.3 km || 
|-id=417 bgcolor=#fefefe
| 165417 ||  || — || December 30, 2000 || Socorro || LINEAR || MAS || align=right | 1.1 km || 
|-id=418 bgcolor=#fefefe
| 165418 ||  || — || December 30, 2000 || Socorro || LINEAR || — || align=right | 2.0 km || 
|-id=419 bgcolor=#fefefe
| 165419 ||  || — || December 30, 2000 || Socorro || LINEAR || SUL || align=right | 4.7 km || 
|-id=420 bgcolor=#E9E9E9
| 165420 ||  || — || December 30, 2000 || Socorro || LINEAR || — || align=right | 2.7 km || 
|-id=421 bgcolor=#fefefe
| 165421 ||  || — || December 30, 2000 || Socorro || LINEAR || — || align=right | 3.5 km || 
|-id=422 bgcolor=#fefefe
| 165422 ||  || — || December 30, 2000 || Socorro || LINEAR || FLO || align=right | 1.5 km || 
|-id=423 bgcolor=#fefefe
| 165423 ||  || — || December 30, 2000 || Socorro || LINEAR || MAS || align=right | 1.5 km || 
|-id=424 bgcolor=#fefefe
| 165424 ||  || — || December 30, 2000 || Socorro || LINEAR || NYS || align=right | 1.2 km || 
|-id=425 bgcolor=#fefefe
| 165425 ||  || — || December 30, 2000 || Socorro || LINEAR || V || align=right | 1.6 km || 
|-id=426 bgcolor=#fefefe
| 165426 ||  || — || December 30, 2000 || Socorro || LINEAR || NYS || align=right | 1.3 km || 
|-id=427 bgcolor=#fefefe
| 165427 ||  || — || December 30, 2000 || Socorro || LINEAR || V || align=right | 1.4 km || 
|-id=428 bgcolor=#fefefe
| 165428 ||  || — || December 30, 2000 || Socorro || LINEAR || NYS || align=right | 1.5 km || 
|-id=429 bgcolor=#fefefe
| 165429 ||  || — || December 30, 2000 || Kitt Peak || Spacewatch || MAS || align=right | 1.1 km || 
|-id=430 bgcolor=#fefefe
| 165430 ||  || — || December 30, 2000 || Socorro || LINEAR || — || align=right | 1.4 km || 
|-id=431 bgcolor=#fefefe
| 165431 ||  || — || December 30, 2000 || Socorro || LINEAR || — || align=right | 1.6 km || 
|-id=432 bgcolor=#fefefe
| 165432 ||  || — || December 30, 2000 || Socorro || LINEAR || — || align=right | 1.3 km || 
|-id=433 bgcolor=#fefefe
| 165433 ||  || — || December 30, 2000 || Socorro || LINEAR || — || align=right | 2.1 km || 
|-id=434 bgcolor=#fefefe
| 165434 ||  || — || December 30, 2000 || Socorro || LINEAR || — || align=right | 1.6 km || 
|-id=435 bgcolor=#fefefe
| 165435 ||  || — || December 30, 2000 || Socorro || LINEAR || MAS || align=right | 1.2 km || 
|-id=436 bgcolor=#fefefe
| 165436 ||  || — || December 30, 2000 || Socorro || LINEAR || — || align=right | 1.5 km || 
|-id=437 bgcolor=#fefefe
| 165437 ||  || — || December 30, 2000 || Socorro || LINEAR || — || align=right | 1.4 km || 
|-id=438 bgcolor=#fefefe
| 165438 ||  || — || December 30, 2000 || Socorro || LINEAR || MAS || align=right | 1.4 km || 
|-id=439 bgcolor=#E9E9E9
| 165439 ||  || — || December 30, 2000 || Socorro || LINEAR || — || align=right | 1.8 km || 
|-id=440 bgcolor=#fefefe
| 165440 ||  || — || December 30, 2000 || Socorro || LINEAR || NYS || align=right | 1.1 km || 
|-id=441 bgcolor=#fefefe
| 165441 ||  || — || December 30, 2000 || Socorro || LINEAR || — || align=right | 1.6 km || 
|-id=442 bgcolor=#fefefe
| 165442 ||  || — || December 30, 2000 || Socorro || LINEAR || MAS || align=right | 1.1 km || 
|-id=443 bgcolor=#fefefe
| 165443 ||  || — || December 28, 2000 || Socorro || LINEAR || — || align=right | 1.6 km || 
|-id=444 bgcolor=#E9E9E9
| 165444 ||  || — || December 28, 2000 || Socorro || LINEAR || — || align=right | 2.5 km || 
|-id=445 bgcolor=#fefefe
| 165445 ||  || — || December 30, 2000 || Socorro || LINEAR || — || align=right | 1.8 km || 
|-id=446 bgcolor=#fefefe
| 165446 ||  || — || December 30, 2000 || Socorro || LINEAR || NYS || align=right | 1.2 km || 
|-id=447 bgcolor=#fefefe
| 165447 ||  || — || December 30, 2000 || Socorro || LINEAR || NYS || align=right | 1.0 km || 
|-id=448 bgcolor=#fefefe
| 165448 ||  || — || December 30, 2000 || Socorro || LINEAR || — || align=right | 2.0 km || 
|-id=449 bgcolor=#fefefe
| 165449 ||  || — || December 30, 2000 || Socorro || LINEAR || — || align=right | 1.5 km || 
|-id=450 bgcolor=#fefefe
| 165450 ||  || — || December 30, 2000 || Socorro || LINEAR || NYS || align=right data-sort-value="0.92" | 920 m || 
|-id=451 bgcolor=#E9E9E9
| 165451 ||  || — || December 30, 2000 || Socorro || LINEAR || — || align=right | 2.7 km || 
|-id=452 bgcolor=#fefefe
| 165452 ||  || — || December 30, 2000 || Socorro || LINEAR || — || align=right | 1.6 km || 
|-id=453 bgcolor=#E9E9E9
| 165453 ||  || — || December 30, 2000 || Socorro || LINEAR || KON || align=right | 4.1 km || 
|-id=454 bgcolor=#fefefe
| 165454 ||  || — || December 17, 2000 || Kitt Peak || Spacewatch || — || align=right | 1.8 km || 
|-id=455 bgcolor=#fefefe
| 165455 ||  || — || December 17, 2000 || Kitt Peak || Spacewatch || NYS || align=right | 1.2 km || 
|-id=456 bgcolor=#E9E9E9
| 165456 ||  || — || December 29, 2000 || Anderson Mesa || LONEOS || — || align=right | 3.3 km || 
|-id=457 bgcolor=#fefefe
| 165457 ||  || — || December 29, 2000 || Kitt Peak || Spacewatch || NYS || align=right data-sort-value="0.99" | 990 m || 
|-id=458 bgcolor=#fefefe
| 165458 ||  || — || December 30, 2000 || Socorro || LINEAR || — || align=right | 1.7 km || 
|-id=459 bgcolor=#fefefe
| 165459 ||  || — || December 30, 2000 || Socorro || LINEAR || MAS || align=right | 1.2 km || 
|-id=460 bgcolor=#fefefe
| 165460 ||  || — || December 31, 2000 || Kitt Peak || Spacewatch || MAS || align=right | 1.1 km || 
|-id=461 bgcolor=#fefefe
| 165461 ||  || — || December 23, 2000 || Socorro || LINEAR || — || align=right | 2.3 km || 
|-id=462 bgcolor=#fefefe
| 165462 ||  || — || January 2, 2001 || Kitt Peak || Spacewatch || — || align=right | 1.5 km || 
|-id=463 bgcolor=#E9E9E9
| 165463 ||  || — || January 2, 2001 || Socorro || LINEAR || — || align=right | 2.8 km || 
|-id=464 bgcolor=#FA8072
| 165464 ||  || — || January 4, 2001 || Socorro || LINEAR || — || align=right | 1.6 km || 
|-id=465 bgcolor=#fefefe
| 165465 ||  || — || January 3, 2001 || Socorro || LINEAR || — || align=right | 1.7 km || 
|-id=466 bgcolor=#E9E9E9
| 165466 ||  || — || January 5, 2001 || Socorro || LINEAR || — || align=right | 2.4 km || 
|-id=467 bgcolor=#fefefe
| 165467 ||  || — || January 4, 2001 || Socorro || LINEAR || — || align=right | 1.6 km || 
|-id=468 bgcolor=#fefefe
| 165468 ||  || — || January 4, 2001 || Socorro || LINEAR || NYS || align=right | 1.1 km || 
|-id=469 bgcolor=#fefefe
| 165469 ||  || — || January 4, 2001 || Socorro || LINEAR || — || align=right | 2.0 km || 
|-id=470 bgcolor=#fefefe
| 165470 ||  || — || January 5, 2001 || Socorro || LINEAR || — || align=right | 2.2 km || 
|-id=471 bgcolor=#fefefe
| 165471 ||  || — || January 5, 2001 || Socorro || LINEAR || — || align=right | 1.6 km || 
|-id=472 bgcolor=#fefefe
| 165472 ||  || — || January 5, 2001 || Socorro || LINEAR || V || align=right | 1.3 km || 
|-id=473 bgcolor=#fefefe
| 165473 ||  || — || January 5, 2001 || Socorro || LINEAR || H || align=right | 1.3 km || 
|-id=474 bgcolor=#fefefe
| 165474 ||  || — || January 3, 2001 || Socorro || LINEAR || NYS || align=right | 1.3 km || 
|-id=475 bgcolor=#fefefe
| 165475 ||  || — || January 3, 2001 || Anderson Mesa || LONEOS || — || align=right | 1.7 km || 
|-id=476 bgcolor=#fefefe
| 165476 ||  || — || January 3, 2001 || Anderson Mesa || LONEOS || NYS || align=right | 1.2 km || 
|-id=477 bgcolor=#fefefe
| 165477 ||  || — || January 15, 2001 || Oizumi || T. Kobayashi || NYS || align=right | 1.6 km || 
|-id=478 bgcolor=#fefefe
| 165478 ||  || — || January 15, 2001 || Socorro || LINEAR || PHO || align=right | 4.3 km || 
|-id=479 bgcolor=#fefefe
| 165479 ||  || — || January 15, 2001 || Socorro || LINEAR || — || align=right | 1.9 km || 
|-id=480 bgcolor=#fefefe
| 165480 ||  || — || January 14, 2001 || Kitt Peak || Spacewatch || V || align=right | 1.1 km || 
|-id=481 bgcolor=#fefefe
| 165481 ||  || — || January 15, 2001 || Kitt Peak || Spacewatch || NYS || align=right | 1.1 km || 
|-id=482 bgcolor=#fefefe
| 165482 || 2001 BC || — || January 17, 2001 || Oizumi || T. Kobayashi || — || align=right | 1.9 km || 
|-id=483 bgcolor=#fefefe
| 165483 ||  || — || January 19, 2001 || Socorro || LINEAR || — || align=right | 1.5 km || 
|-id=484 bgcolor=#E9E9E9
| 165484 ||  || — || January 19, 2001 || Socorro || LINEAR || — || align=right | 1.7 km || 
|-id=485 bgcolor=#fefefe
| 165485 ||  || — || January 19, 2001 || Socorro || LINEAR || MAS || align=right | 1.0 km || 
|-id=486 bgcolor=#E9E9E9
| 165486 ||  || — || January 19, 2001 || Socorro || LINEAR || — || align=right | 1.7 km || 
|-id=487 bgcolor=#fefefe
| 165487 ||  || — || January 19, 2001 || Socorro || LINEAR || ERI || align=right | 3.3 km || 
|-id=488 bgcolor=#fefefe
| 165488 ||  || — || January 20, 2001 || Socorro || LINEAR || — || align=right | 1.7 km || 
|-id=489 bgcolor=#fefefe
| 165489 ||  || — || January 20, 2001 || Socorro || LINEAR || NYS || align=right | 1.1 km || 
|-id=490 bgcolor=#fefefe
| 165490 ||  || — || January 20, 2001 || Socorro || LINEAR || — || align=right | 1.4 km || 
|-id=491 bgcolor=#fefefe
| 165491 ||  || — || January 20, 2001 || Socorro || LINEAR || — || align=right | 1.9 km || 
|-id=492 bgcolor=#fefefe
| 165492 ||  || — || January 20, 2001 || Socorro || LINEAR || NYS || align=right | 1.4 km || 
|-id=493 bgcolor=#fefefe
| 165493 ||  || — || January 20, 2001 || Socorro || LINEAR || NYS || align=right | 1.8 km || 
|-id=494 bgcolor=#fefefe
| 165494 ||  || — || January 25, 2001 || Socorro || LINEAR || PHO || align=right | 1.6 km || 
|-id=495 bgcolor=#fefefe
| 165495 ||  || — || January 21, 2001 || Socorro || LINEAR || — || align=right | 1.9 km || 
|-id=496 bgcolor=#fefefe
| 165496 ||  || — || January 21, 2001 || Socorro || LINEAR || NYS || align=right | 1.1 km || 
|-id=497 bgcolor=#fefefe
| 165497 ||  || — || January 17, 2001 || Haleakala || NEAT || — || align=right | 1.5 km || 
|-id=498 bgcolor=#fefefe
| 165498 ||  || — || January 17, 2001 || Haleakala || NEAT || NYS || align=right | 1.5 km || 
|-id=499 bgcolor=#fefefe
| 165499 ||  || — || January 17, 2001 || Haleakala || NEAT || NYS || align=right | 1.2 km || 
|-id=500 bgcolor=#E9E9E9
| 165500 ||  || — || January 19, 2001 || Haleakala || NEAT || — || align=right | 2.1 km || 
|}

165501–165600 

|-bgcolor=#E9E9E9
| 165501 ||  || — || January 26, 2001 || Socorro || LINEAR || EUN || align=right | 2.0 km || 
|-id=502 bgcolor=#E9E9E9
| 165502 ||  || — || January 31, 2001 || Socorro || LINEAR || MAR || align=right | 2.8 km || 
|-id=503 bgcolor=#fefefe
| 165503 ||  || — || January 31, 2001 || Socorro || LINEAR || NYS || align=right | 1.6 km || 
|-id=504 bgcolor=#fefefe
| 165504 ||  || — || January 27, 2001 || Haleakala || NEAT || V || align=right | 1.3 km || 
|-id=505 bgcolor=#E9E9E9
| 165505 ||  || — || January 26, 2001 || Socorro || LINEAR || ADE || align=right | 3.5 km || 
|-id=506 bgcolor=#fefefe
| 165506 ||  || — || January 21, 2001 || Socorro || LINEAR || MAS || align=right | 1.2 km || 
|-id=507 bgcolor=#fefefe
| 165507 ||  || — || February 1, 2001 || Socorro || LINEAR || NYS || align=right | 2.0 km || 
|-id=508 bgcolor=#E9E9E9
| 165508 ||  || — || February 1, 2001 || Socorro || LINEAR || — || align=right | 1.9 km || 
|-id=509 bgcolor=#fefefe
| 165509 ||  || — || February 1, 2001 || Socorro || LINEAR || — || align=right | 1.8 km || 
|-id=510 bgcolor=#E9E9E9
| 165510 ||  || — || February 1, 2001 || Socorro || LINEAR || — || align=right | 3.0 km || 
|-id=511 bgcolor=#fefefe
| 165511 ||  || — || February 1, 2001 || Socorro || LINEAR || NYS || align=right | 1.2 km || 
|-id=512 bgcolor=#E9E9E9
| 165512 ||  || — || February 1, 2001 || Socorro || LINEAR || — || align=right | 1.9 km || 
|-id=513 bgcolor=#E9E9E9
| 165513 ||  || — || February 1, 2001 || Socorro || LINEAR || — || align=right | 2.8 km || 
|-id=514 bgcolor=#fefefe
| 165514 ||  || — || February 1, 2001 || Socorro || LINEAR || — || align=right | 1.6 km || 
|-id=515 bgcolor=#E9E9E9
| 165515 ||  || — || February 1, 2001 || Socorro || LINEAR || RAF || align=right | 1.3 km || 
|-id=516 bgcolor=#fefefe
| 165516 ||  || — || February 1, 2001 || Socorro || LINEAR || — || align=right | 1.6 km || 
|-id=517 bgcolor=#fefefe
| 165517 ||  || — || February 1, 2001 || Socorro || LINEAR || — || align=right | 1.7 km || 
|-id=518 bgcolor=#fefefe
| 165518 ||  || — || February 1, 2001 || Socorro || LINEAR || — || align=right | 1.6 km || 
|-id=519 bgcolor=#E9E9E9
| 165519 ||  || — || February 1, 2001 || Socorro || LINEAR || — || align=right | 4.3 km || 
|-id=520 bgcolor=#fefefe
| 165520 ||  || — || February 2, 2001 || Socorro || LINEAR || — || align=right | 1.9 km || 
|-id=521 bgcolor=#fefefe
| 165521 ||  || — || February 2, 2001 || Socorro || LINEAR || NYS || align=right | 1.4 km || 
|-id=522 bgcolor=#fefefe
| 165522 ||  || — || February 3, 2001 || Socorro || LINEAR || V || align=right | 1.3 km || 
|-id=523 bgcolor=#E9E9E9
| 165523 ||  || — || February 3, 2001 || Socorro || LINEAR || — || align=right | 5.6 km || 
|-id=524 bgcolor=#E9E9E9
| 165524 ||  || — || February 1, 2001 || Anderson Mesa || LONEOS || — || align=right | 3.0 km || 
|-id=525 bgcolor=#fefefe
| 165525 ||  || — || February 1, 2001 || Anderson Mesa || LONEOS || — || align=right | 1.6 km || 
|-id=526 bgcolor=#fefefe
| 165526 ||  || — || February 1, 2001 || Anderson Mesa || LONEOS || NYS || align=right | 1.1 km || 
|-id=527 bgcolor=#fefefe
| 165527 ||  || — || February 1, 2001 || Anderson Mesa || LONEOS || V || align=right | 1.4 km || 
|-id=528 bgcolor=#E9E9E9
| 165528 ||  || — || February 2, 2001 || Anderson Mesa || LONEOS || — || align=right | 2.2 km || 
|-id=529 bgcolor=#E9E9E9
| 165529 ||  || — || February 13, 2001 || Socorro || LINEAR || — || align=right | 2.5 km || 
|-id=530 bgcolor=#fefefe
| 165530 ||  || — || February 13, 2001 || Socorro || LINEAR || — || align=right | 1.6 km || 
|-id=531 bgcolor=#C2FFFF
| 165531 ||  || — || February 15, 2001 || Nogales || Tenagra II Obs. || L4 || align=right | 15 km || 
|-id=532 bgcolor=#fefefe
| 165532 ||  || — || February 13, 2001 || Socorro || LINEAR || — || align=right | 1.9 km || 
|-id=533 bgcolor=#fefefe
| 165533 ||  || — || February 13, 2001 || Kitt Peak || Spacewatch || NYS || align=right | 1.1 km || 
|-id=534 bgcolor=#E9E9E9
| 165534 ||  || — || February 13, 2001 || Kitt Peak || Spacewatch || — || align=right | 2.0 km || 
|-id=535 bgcolor=#fefefe
| 165535 || 2001 DZ || — || February 16, 2001 || Nogales || Tenagra II Obs. || SUL || align=right | 3.4 km || 
|-id=536 bgcolor=#fefefe
| 165536 ||  || — || February 16, 2001 || Socorro || LINEAR || ERI || align=right | 3.7 km || 
|-id=537 bgcolor=#E9E9E9
| 165537 ||  || — || February 16, 2001 || Socorro || LINEAR || — || align=right | 4.4 km || 
|-id=538 bgcolor=#fefefe
| 165538 ||  || — || February 16, 2001 || Socorro || LINEAR || — || align=right | 1.4 km || 
|-id=539 bgcolor=#E9E9E9
| 165539 ||  || — || February 17, 2001 || Nogales || Tenagra II Obs. || — || align=right | 1.6 km || 
|-id=540 bgcolor=#E9E9E9
| 165540 ||  || — || February 16, 2001 || Socorro || LINEAR || RAF || align=right | 1.8 km || 
|-id=541 bgcolor=#fefefe
| 165541 ||  || — || February 16, 2001 || Socorro || LINEAR || — || align=right | 1.5 km || 
|-id=542 bgcolor=#fefefe
| 165542 ||  || — || February 17, 2001 || Socorro || LINEAR || NYS || align=right | 1.5 km || 
|-id=543 bgcolor=#E9E9E9
| 165543 ||  || — || February 17, 2001 || Socorro || LINEAR || — || align=right | 1.7 km || 
|-id=544 bgcolor=#E9E9E9
| 165544 ||  || — || February 17, 2001 || Socorro || LINEAR || — || align=right | 1.5 km || 
|-id=545 bgcolor=#fefefe
| 165545 ||  || — || February 19, 2001 || Socorro || LINEAR || NYS || align=right | 1.4 km || 
|-id=546 bgcolor=#fefefe
| 165546 ||  || — || February 19, 2001 || Socorro || LINEAR || — || align=right | 1.9 km || 
|-id=547 bgcolor=#fefefe
| 165547 ||  || — || February 19, 2001 || Socorro || LINEAR || MAS || align=right | 1.5 km || 
|-id=548 bgcolor=#E9E9E9
| 165548 ||  || — || February 19, 2001 || Socorro || LINEAR || — || align=right | 2.1 km || 
|-id=549 bgcolor=#fefefe
| 165549 ||  || — || February 19, 2001 || Socorro || LINEAR || — || align=right | 1.7 km || 
|-id=550 bgcolor=#fefefe
| 165550 ||  || — || February 19, 2001 || Socorro || LINEAR || — || align=right | 1.4 km || 
|-id=551 bgcolor=#C2FFFF
| 165551 ||  || — || February 19, 2001 || Socorro || LINEAR || L4 || align=right | 14 km || 
|-id=552 bgcolor=#E9E9E9
| 165552 ||  || — || February 19, 2001 || Socorro || LINEAR || — || align=right | 2.2 km || 
|-id=553 bgcolor=#fefefe
| 165553 ||  || — || February 19, 2001 || Socorro || LINEAR || NYS || align=right | 1.2 km || 
|-id=554 bgcolor=#fefefe
| 165554 ||  || — || February 19, 2001 || Socorro || LINEAR || — || align=right | 2.6 km || 
|-id=555 bgcolor=#E9E9E9
| 165555 ||  || — || February 19, 2001 || Socorro || LINEAR || — || align=right | 2.3 km || 
|-id=556 bgcolor=#fefefe
| 165556 ||  || — || February 19, 2001 || Socorro || LINEAR || NYS || align=right | 1.4 km || 
|-id=557 bgcolor=#E9E9E9
| 165557 ||  || — || February 19, 2001 || Socorro || LINEAR || MAR || align=right | 2.0 km || 
|-id=558 bgcolor=#d6d6d6
| 165558 ||  || — || February 17, 2001 || Kitt Peak || Spacewatch || HIL3:2 || align=right | 9.8 km || 
|-id=559 bgcolor=#fefefe
| 165559 ||  || — || February 16, 2001 || Socorro || LINEAR || — || align=right | 1.6 km || 
|-id=560 bgcolor=#E9E9E9
| 165560 ||  || — || February 16, 2001 || Socorro || LINEAR || EUN || align=right | 2.7 km || 
|-id=561 bgcolor=#fefefe
| 165561 ||  || — || February 17, 2001 || Socorro || LINEAR || — || align=right | 1.4 km || 
|-id=562 bgcolor=#fefefe
| 165562 ||  || — || February 16, 2001 || Kitt Peak || Spacewatch || — || align=right | 1.4 km || 
|-id=563 bgcolor=#E9E9E9
| 165563 ||  || — || February 16, 2001 || Kitt Peak || Spacewatch || — || align=right | 2.7 km || 
|-id=564 bgcolor=#fefefe
| 165564 ||  || — || February 19, 2001 || Socorro || LINEAR || NYS || align=right | 1.1 km || 
|-id=565 bgcolor=#E9E9E9
| 165565 ||  || — || February 19, 2001 || Socorro || LINEAR || — || align=right | 1.7 km || 
|-id=566 bgcolor=#E9E9E9
| 165566 ||  || — || February 26, 2001 || Oizumi || T. Kobayashi || — || align=right | 4.1 km || 
|-id=567 bgcolor=#fefefe
| 165567 ||  || — || February 22, 2001 || Kitt Peak || Spacewatch || — || align=right | 1.0 km || 
|-id=568 bgcolor=#E9E9E9
| 165568 ||  || — || February 22, 2001 || Kitt Peak || Spacewatch || — || align=right | 1.8 km || 
|-id=569 bgcolor=#C2FFFF
| 165569 ||  || — || February 20, 2001 || Socorro || LINEAR || L4 || align=right | 11 km || 
|-id=570 bgcolor=#E9E9E9
| 165570 ||  || — || February 20, 2001 || Kitt Peak || Spacewatch || MRX || align=right | 1.7 km || 
|-id=571 bgcolor=#E9E9E9
| 165571 ||  || — || February 20, 2001 || Kitt Peak || Spacewatch || — || align=right | 1.9 km || 
|-id=572 bgcolor=#E9E9E9
| 165572 ||  || — || February 17, 2001 || Socorro || LINEAR || — || align=right | 1.7 km || 
|-id=573 bgcolor=#E9E9E9
| 165573 ||  || — || February 16, 2001 || Socorro || LINEAR || — || align=right | 2.1 km || 
|-id=574 bgcolor=#E9E9E9
| 165574 Deidre ||  ||  || February 16, 2001 || Anderson Mesa || LONEOS || — || align=right | 3.6 km || 
|-id=575 bgcolor=#E9E9E9
| 165575 ||  || — || February 20, 2001 || Kitt Peak || Spacewatch || — || align=right | 1.6 km || 
|-id=576 bgcolor=#E9E9E9
| 165576 ||  || — || February 16, 2001 || Anderson Mesa || LONEOS || — || align=right | 1.8 km || 
|-id=577 bgcolor=#fefefe
| 165577 || 2001 EA || — || March 2, 2001 || Haleakala || NEAT || — || align=right | 2.0 km || 
|-id=578 bgcolor=#E9E9E9
| 165578 ||  || — || March 3, 2001 || Kitt Peak || Spacewatch || — || align=right | 1.4 km || 
|-id=579 bgcolor=#fefefe
| 165579 ||  || — || March 2, 2001 || Anderson Mesa || LONEOS || NYS || align=right data-sort-value="0.91" | 910 m || 
|-id=580 bgcolor=#E9E9E9
| 165580 ||  || — || March 2, 2001 || Anderson Mesa || LONEOS || RAF || align=right | 2.1 km || 
|-id=581 bgcolor=#E9E9E9
| 165581 ||  || — || March 15, 2001 || Socorro || LINEAR || EUN || align=right | 2.8 km || 
|-id=582 bgcolor=#fefefe
| 165582 ||  || — || March 3, 2001 || Socorro || LINEAR || H || align=right | 1.5 km || 
|-id=583 bgcolor=#E9E9E9
| 165583 ||  || — || March 15, 2001 || Anderson Mesa || LONEOS || — || align=right | 4.3 km || 
|-id=584 bgcolor=#E9E9E9
| 165584 ||  || — || March 15, 2001 || Kitt Peak || Spacewatch || — || align=right | 2.6 km || 
|-id=585 bgcolor=#E9E9E9
| 165585 ||  || — || March 15, 2001 || Kitt Peak || Spacewatch || — || align=right | 3.3 km || 
|-id=586 bgcolor=#E9E9E9
| 165586 ||  || — || March 18, 2001 || Socorro || LINEAR || — || align=right | 2.1 km || 
|-id=587 bgcolor=#E9E9E9
| 165587 ||  || — || March 20, 2001 || Eskridge || G. Hug || — || align=right | 1.7 km || 
|-id=588 bgcolor=#E9E9E9
| 165588 ||  || — || March 19, 2001 || Anderson Mesa || LONEOS || — || align=right | 3.6 km || 
|-id=589 bgcolor=#E9E9E9
| 165589 ||  || — || March 21, 2001 || Anderson Mesa || LONEOS || — || align=right | 1.6 km || 
|-id=590 bgcolor=#fefefe
| 165590 ||  || — || March 19, 2001 || Socorro || LINEAR || H || align=right data-sort-value="0.90" | 900 m || 
|-id=591 bgcolor=#E9E9E9
| 165591 ||  || — || March 19, 2001 || Socorro || LINEAR || — || align=right | 2.8 km || 
|-id=592 bgcolor=#E9E9E9
| 165592 ||  || — || March 20, 2001 || Haleakala || NEAT || — || align=right | 2.3 km || 
|-id=593 bgcolor=#E9E9E9
| 165593 ||  || — || March 22, 2001 || Kitt Peak || Spacewatch || MAR || align=right | 1.8 km || 
|-id=594 bgcolor=#E9E9E9
| 165594 ||  || — || March 18, 2001 || Socorro || LINEAR || — || align=right | 4.2 km || 
|-id=595 bgcolor=#E9E9E9
| 165595 ||  || — || March 18, 2001 || Socorro || LINEAR || — || align=right | 5.1 km || 
|-id=596 bgcolor=#E9E9E9
| 165596 ||  || — || March 18, 2001 || Socorro || LINEAR || — || align=right | 2.7 km || 
|-id=597 bgcolor=#E9E9E9
| 165597 ||  || — || March 18, 2001 || Socorro || LINEAR || EUN || align=right | 2.2 km || 
|-id=598 bgcolor=#E9E9E9
| 165598 ||  || — || March 18, 2001 || Socorro || LINEAR || — || align=right | 2.7 km || 
|-id=599 bgcolor=#E9E9E9
| 165599 ||  || — || March 18, 2001 || Socorro || LINEAR || — || align=right | 3.3 km || 
|-id=600 bgcolor=#E9E9E9
| 165600 ||  || — || March 18, 2001 || Socorro || LINEAR || — || align=right | 5.6 km || 
|}

165601–165700 

|-bgcolor=#E9E9E9
| 165601 ||  || — || March 18, 2001 || Socorro || LINEAR || — || align=right | 1.7 km || 
|-id=602 bgcolor=#E9E9E9
| 165602 ||  || — || March 21, 2001 || Socorro || LINEAR || — || align=right | 3.5 km || 
|-id=603 bgcolor=#E9E9E9
| 165603 ||  || — || March 23, 2001 || Haleakala || NEAT || MAR || align=right | 1.9 km || 
|-id=604 bgcolor=#fefefe
| 165604 ||  || — || March 19, 2001 || Socorro || LINEAR || — || align=right | 1.7 km || 
|-id=605 bgcolor=#E9E9E9
| 165605 ||  || — || March 19, 2001 || Socorro || LINEAR || — || align=right | 1.9 km || 
|-id=606 bgcolor=#E9E9E9
| 165606 ||  || — || March 19, 2001 || Socorro || LINEAR || EUN || align=right | 2.2 km || 
|-id=607 bgcolor=#E9E9E9
| 165607 ||  || — || March 19, 2001 || Socorro || LINEAR || AER || align=right | 2.5 km || 
|-id=608 bgcolor=#E9E9E9
| 165608 ||  || — || March 19, 2001 || Socorro || LINEAR || — || align=right | 2.7 km || 
|-id=609 bgcolor=#E9E9E9
| 165609 ||  || — || March 19, 2001 || Socorro || LINEAR || EUN || align=right | 2.1 km || 
|-id=610 bgcolor=#E9E9E9
| 165610 ||  || — || March 23, 2001 || Socorro || LINEAR || — || align=right | 2.0 km || 
|-id=611 bgcolor=#E9E9E9
| 165611 ||  || — || March 26, 2001 || Kitt Peak || Spacewatch || — || align=right | 1.9 km || 
|-id=612 bgcolor=#E9E9E9
| 165612 Stackpole ||  ||  || March 23, 2001 || Junk Bond || D. Healy || — || align=right | 1.5 km || 
|-id=613 bgcolor=#fefefe
| 165613 ||  || — || March 27, 2001 || Kitt Peak || Spacewatch || — || align=right | 1.0 km || 
|-id=614 bgcolor=#E9E9E9
| 165614 ||  || — || March 16, 2001 || Socorro || LINEAR || — || align=right | 3.8 km || 
|-id=615 bgcolor=#E9E9E9
| 165615 ||  || — || March 16, 2001 || Socorro || LINEAR || BRU || align=right | 5.2 km || 
|-id=616 bgcolor=#E9E9E9
| 165616 ||  || — || March 17, 2001 || Socorro || LINEAR || — || align=right | 1.7 km || 
|-id=617 bgcolor=#E9E9E9
| 165617 ||  || — || March 18, 2001 || Kitt Peak || Spacewatch || MAR || align=right | 1.9 km || 
|-id=618 bgcolor=#E9E9E9
| 165618 ||  || — || March 18, 2001 || Anderson Mesa || LONEOS || — || align=right | 1.5 km || 
|-id=619 bgcolor=#fefefe
| 165619 ||  || — || March 18, 2001 || Anderson Mesa || LONEOS || NYS || align=right | 1.3 km || 
|-id=620 bgcolor=#E9E9E9
| 165620 ||  || — || March 18, 2001 || Socorro || LINEAR || — || align=right | 2.3 km || 
|-id=621 bgcolor=#E9E9E9
| 165621 ||  || — || March 18, 2001 || Socorro || LINEAR || — || align=right | 2.7 km || 
|-id=622 bgcolor=#E9E9E9
| 165622 ||  || — || March 18, 2001 || Socorro || LINEAR || BRU || align=right | 4.4 km || 
|-id=623 bgcolor=#E9E9E9
| 165623 ||  || — || March 19, 2001 || Anderson Mesa || LONEOS || — || align=right | 1.5 km || 
|-id=624 bgcolor=#fefefe
| 165624 ||  || — || March 19, 2001 || Uccle || T. Pauwels || — || align=right | 1.5 km || 
|-id=625 bgcolor=#E9E9E9
| 165625 ||  || — || March 29, 2001 || Socorro || LINEAR || — || align=right | 4.1 km || 
|-id=626 bgcolor=#E9E9E9
| 165626 ||  || — || March 21, 2001 || Socorro || LINEAR || — || align=right | 4.8 km || 
|-id=627 bgcolor=#E9E9E9
| 165627 ||  || — || March 23, 2001 || Haleakala || NEAT || — || align=right | 2.2 km || 
|-id=628 bgcolor=#E9E9E9
| 165628 ||  || — || March 24, 2001 || Anderson Mesa || LONEOS || — || align=right | 2.4 km || 
|-id=629 bgcolor=#E9E9E9
| 165629 ||  || — || March 24, 2001 || Haleakala || NEAT || — || align=right | 2.3 km || 
|-id=630 bgcolor=#E9E9E9
| 165630 ||  || — || March 26, 2001 || Haleakala || NEAT || — || align=right | 3.6 km || 
|-id=631 bgcolor=#E9E9E9
| 165631 ||  || — || March 29, 2001 || Haleakala || NEAT || — || align=right | 4.5 km || 
|-id=632 bgcolor=#E9E9E9
| 165632 ||  || — || March 18, 2001 || Socorro || LINEAR || — || align=right | 3.3 km || 
|-id=633 bgcolor=#E9E9E9
| 165633 ||  || — || March 19, 2001 || Anderson Mesa || LONEOS || — || align=right | 1.9 km || 
|-id=634 bgcolor=#E9E9E9
| 165634 ||  || — || March 24, 2001 || Anderson Mesa || LONEOS || — || align=right | 4.5 km || 
|-id=635 bgcolor=#E9E9E9
| 165635 ||  || — || March 16, 2001 || Socorro || LINEAR || — || align=right | 2.3 km || 
|-id=636 bgcolor=#E9E9E9
| 165636 ||  || — || March 20, 2001 || Kitt Peak || Spacewatch || — || align=right | 2.5 km || 
|-id=637 bgcolor=#E9E9E9
| 165637 ||  || — || March 21, 2001 || Kitt Peak || Spacewatch || — || align=right | 1.2 km || 
|-id=638 bgcolor=#E9E9E9
| 165638 ||  || — || March 21, 2001 || Haleakala || NEAT || — || align=right | 1.4 km || 
|-id=639 bgcolor=#fefefe
| 165639 ||  || — || April 15, 2001 || Socorro || LINEAR || H || align=right | 1.0 km || 
|-id=640 bgcolor=#E9E9E9
| 165640 ||  || — || April 15, 2001 || Kitt Peak || Spacewatch || MAR || align=right | 2.1 km || 
|-id=641 bgcolor=#E9E9E9
| 165641 ||  || — || April 15, 2001 || Haleakala || NEAT || EUN || align=right | 2.2 km || 
|-id=642 bgcolor=#E9E9E9
| 165642 ||  || — || April 15, 2001 || Socorro || LINEAR || — || align=right | 4.2 km || 
|-id=643 bgcolor=#E9E9E9
| 165643 ||  || — || April 15, 2001 || Socorro || LINEAR || — || align=right | 3.2 km || 
|-id=644 bgcolor=#E9E9E9
| 165644 ||  || — || April 17, 2001 || Socorro || LINEAR || INO || align=right | 2.2 km || 
|-id=645 bgcolor=#E9E9E9
| 165645 ||  || — || April 24, 2001 || Kitt Peak || Spacewatch || ADE || align=right | 2.9 km || 
|-id=646 bgcolor=#E9E9E9
| 165646 ||  || — || April 24, 2001 || Kitt Peak || Spacewatch || WIT || align=right | 1.3 km || 
|-id=647 bgcolor=#E9E9E9
| 165647 ||  || — || April 27, 2001 || Kitt Peak || Spacewatch || AGN || align=right | 1.7 km || 
|-id=648 bgcolor=#E9E9E9
| 165648 ||  || — || April 26, 2001 || Kitt Peak || Spacewatch || NEM || align=right | 3.5 km || 
|-id=649 bgcolor=#E9E9E9
| 165649 ||  || — || April 27, 2001 || Socorro || LINEAR || — || align=right | 1.7 km || 
|-id=650 bgcolor=#E9E9E9
| 165650 ||  || — || April 29, 2001 || Socorro || LINEAR || — || align=right | 6.8 km || 
|-id=651 bgcolor=#E9E9E9
| 165651 ||  || — || April 16, 2001 || Socorro || LINEAR || MRX || align=right | 1.9 km || 
|-id=652 bgcolor=#d6d6d6
| 165652 ||  || — || April 16, 2001 || Anderson Mesa || LONEOS || — || align=right | 4.6 km || 
|-id=653 bgcolor=#E9E9E9
| 165653 ||  || — || May 15, 2001 || Haleakala || NEAT || — || align=right | 5.1 km || 
|-id=654 bgcolor=#d6d6d6
| 165654 ||  || — || May 2, 2001 || Kitt Peak || Spacewatch || — || align=right | 4.2 km || 
|-id=655 bgcolor=#E9E9E9
| 165655 ||  || — || May 19, 2001 || Ondřejov || P. Kušnirák, P. Pravec || — || align=right | 3.2 km || 
|-id=656 bgcolor=#d6d6d6
| 165656 ||  || — || May 18, 2001 || Socorro || LINEAR || — || align=right | 4.2 km || 
|-id=657 bgcolor=#d6d6d6
| 165657 ||  || — || May 20, 2001 || Bergisch Gladbach || W. Bickel || — || align=right | 3.7 km || 
|-id=658 bgcolor=#E9E9E9
| 165658 ||  || — || June 12, 2001 || Kitt Peak || Spacewatch || — || align=right | 2.0 km || 
|-id=659 bgcolor=#d6d6d6
| 165659 Michaelhicks ||  ||  || June 15, 2001 || Haleakala || NEAT || Tj (2.95) || align=right | 6.7 km || 
|-id=660 bgcolor=#d6d6d6
| 165660 ||  || — || June 15, 2001 || Haleakala || NEAT || — || align=right | 5.6 km || 
|-id=661 bgcolor=#d6d6d6
| 165661 ||  || — || June 16, 2001 || Palomar || NEAT || — || align=right | 4.6 km || 
|-id=662 bgcolor=#d6d6d6
| 165662 ||  || — || June 27, 2001 || Anderson Mesa || LONEOS || — || align=right | 6.2 km || 
|-id=663 bgcolor=#d6d6d6
| 165663 ||  || — || June 27, 2001 || Haleakala || NEAT || — || align=right | 6.3 km || 
|-id=664 bgcolor=#d6d6d6
| 165664 ||  || — || June 30, 2001 || Palomar || NEAT || VER || align=right | 6.5 km || 
|-id=665 bgcolor=#d6d6d6
| 165665 ||  || — || June 16, 2001 || Anderson Mesa || LONEOS || EOS || align=right | 3.3 km || 
|-id=666 bgcolor=#d6d6d6
| 165666 ||  || — || July 12, 2001 || Palomar || NEAT || — || align=right | 7.7 km || 
|-id=667 bgcolor=#d6d6d6
| 165667 ||  || — || July 13, 2001 || Palomar || NEAT || — || align=right | 3.3 km || 
|-id=668 bgcolor=#d6d6d6
| 165668 ||  || — || July 13, 2001 || Haleakala || NEAT || — || align=right | 5.3 km || 
|-id=669 bgcolor=#d6d6d6
| 165669 ||  || — || July 14, 2001 || Palomar || NEAT || — || align=right | 4.4 km || 
|-id=670 bgcolor=#d6d6d6
| 165670 ||  || — || July 13, 2001 || Palomar || NEAT || — || align=right | 5.3 km || 
|-id=671 bgcolor=#d6d6d6
| 165671 ||  || — || July 17, 2001 || Haleakala || NEAT || — || align=right | 4.3 km || 
|-id=672 bgcolor=#d6d6d6
| 165672 ||  || — || July 18, 2001 || Palomar || NEAT || LIX || align=right | 5.4 km || 
|-id=673 bgcolor=#d6d6d6
| 165673 ||  || — || July 18, 2001 || Palomar || NEAT || — || align=right | 7.9 km || 
|-id=674 bgcolor=#d6d6d6
| 165674 ||  || — || July 16, 2001 || Anderson Mesa || LONEOS || — || align=right | 4.8 km || 
|-id=675 bgcolor=#d6d6d6
| 165675 ||  || — || July 18, 2001 || Palomar || NEAT || EOS || align=right | 3.3 km || 
|-id=676 bgcolor=#d6d6d6
| 165676 ||  || — || July 21, 2001 || Palomar || NEAT || — || align=right | 7.1 km || 
|-id=677 bgcolor=#d6d6d6
| 165677 ||  || — || July 22, 2001 || Palomar || NEAT || — || align=right | 7.0 km || 
|-id=678 bgcolor=#d6d6d6
| 165678 ||  || — || July 21, 2001 || Palomar || NEAT || — || align=right | 4.4 km || 
|-id=679 bgcolor=#d6d6d6
| 165679 ||  || — || July 21, 2001 || Palomar || NEAT || EOS || align=right | 4.0 km || 
|-id=680 bgcolor=#d6d6d6
| 165680 ||  || — || July 21, 2001 || Haleakala || NEAT || EOS || align=right | 4.1 km || 
|-id=681 bgcolor=#d6d6d6
| 165681 ||  || — || July 24, 2001 || Haleakala || NEAT || — || align=right | 4.8 km || 
|-id=682 bgcolor=#d6d6d6
| 165682 ||  || — || July 22, 2001 || Socorro || LINEAR || — || align=right | 8.6 km || 
|-id=683 bgcolor=#d6d6d6
| 165683 ||  || — || July 16, 2001 || Anderson Mesa || LONEOS || — || align=right | 7.0 km || 
|-id=684 bgcolor=#d6d6d6
| 165684 ||  || — || July 20, 2001 || Palomar || NEAT || — || align=right | 5.8 km || 
|-id=685 bgcolor=#d6d6d6
| 165685 ||  || — || July 27, 2001 || Nacogdoches || SFA Obs. || — || align=right | 4.5 km || 
|-id=686 bgcolor=#d6d6d6
| 165686 ||  || — || July 27, 2001 || Haleakala || NEAT || — || align=right | 4.7 km || 
|-id=687 bgcolor=#d6d6d6
| 165687 ||  || — || July 26, 2001 || Haleakala || NEAT || — || align=right | 4.7 km || 
|-id=688 bgcolor=#d6d6d6
| 165688 ||  || — || July 30, 2001 || Palomar || NEAT || TIR || align=right | 7.3 km || 
|-id=689 bgcolor=#d6d6d6
| 165689 ||  || — || August 8, 2001 || Haleakala || NEAT || — || align=right | 6.2 km || 
|-id=690 bgcolor=#d6d6d6
| 165690 ||  || — || August 3, 2001 || Haleakala || NEAT || — || align=right | 8.0 km || 
|-id=691 bgcolor=#d6d6d6
| 165691 ||  || — || August 10, 2001 || Haleakala || NEAT || THM || align=right | 4.6 km || 
|-id=692 bgcolor=#d6d6d6
| 165692 ||  || — || August 9, 2001 || Palomar || NEAT || TIR || align=right | 5.5 km || 
|-id=693 bgcolor=#d6d6d6
| 165693 ||  || — || August 9, 2001 || Palomar || NEAT || — || align=right | 5.4 km || 
|-id=694 bgcolor=#d6d6d6
| 165694 ||  || — || August 14, 2001 || San Marcello || M. Tombelli, A. Boattini || URS || align=right | 4.1 km || 
|-id=695 bgcolor=#d6d6d6
| 165695 ||  || — || August 10, 2001 || Haleakala || NEAT || — || align=right | 4.4 km || 
|-id=696 bgcolor=#d6d6d6
| 165696 ||  || — || August 10, 2001 || Palomar || NEAT || 7:4 || align=right | 9.6 km || 
|-id=697 bgcolor=#d6d6d6
| 165697 ||  || — || August 10, 2001 || Palomar || NEAT || — || align=right | 5.6 km || 
|-id=698 bgcolor=#d6d6d6
| 165698 ||  || — || August 15, 2001 || Haleakala || NEAT || HYG || align=right | 4.6 km || 
|-id=699 bgcolor=#d6d6d6
| 165699 ||  || — || August 15, 2001 || Haleakala || NEAT || — || align=right | 4.4 km || 
|-id=700 bgcolor=#d6d6d6
| 165700 ||  || — || August 15, 2001 || Haleakala || NEAT || — || align=right | 6.0 km || 
|}

165701–165800 

|-bgcolor=#d6d6d6
| 165701 ||  || — || August 12, 2001 || Palomar || NEAT || — || align=right | 5.0 km || 
|-id=702 bgcolor=#d6d6d6
| 165702 ||  || — || August 14, 2001 || Haleakala || NEAT || — || align=right | 5.3 km || 
|-id=703 bgcolor=#d6d6d6
| 165703 ||  || — || August 13, 2001 || Haleakala || NEAT || HYG || align=right | 5.3 km || 
|-id=704 bgcolor=#d6d6d6
| 165704 ||  || — || August 13, 2001 || Haleakala || NEAT || HYG || align=right | 4.9 km || 
|-id=705 bgcolor=#d6d6d6
| 165705 ||  || — || August 13, 2001 || Haleakala || NEAT || — || align=right | 4.6 km || 
|-id=706 bgcolor=#d6d6d6
| 165706 ||  || — || August 1, 2001 || Palomar || NEAT || — || align=right | 4.4 km || 
|-id=707 bgcolor=#d6d6d6
| 165707 ||  || — || August 13, 2001 || Haleakala || NEAT || — || align=right | 3.8 km || 
|-id=708 bgcolor=#d6d6d6
| 165708 ||  || — || August 15, 2001 || Haleakala || NEAT || — || align=right | 6.4 km || 
|-id=709 bgcolor=#d6d6d6
| 165709 ||  || — || August 9, 2001 || Palomar || NEAT || — || align=right | 6.5 km || 
|-id=710 bgcolor=#d6d6d6
| 165710 ||  || — || August 16, 2001 || Socorro || LINEAR || — || align=right | 4.6 km || 
|-id=711 bgcolor=#d6d6d6
| 165711 ||  || — || August 16, 2001 || Socorro || LINEAR || — || align=right | 4.8 km || 
|-id=712 bgcolor=#d6d6d6
| 165712 ||  || — || August 17, 2001 || Ondřejov || P. Kušnirák, U. Babiaková || THM || align=right | 3.6 km || 
|-id=713 bgcolor=#d6d6d6
| 165713 ||  || — || August 16, 2001 || Socorro || LINEAR || — || align=right | 4.3 km || 
|-id=714 bgcolor=#E9E9E9
| 165714 ||  || — || August 16, 2001 || Socorro || LINEAR || KON || align=right | 4.8 km || 
|-id=715 bgcolor=#d6d6d6
| 165715 ||  || — || August 16, 2001 || Socorro || LINEAR || — || align=right | 3.8 km || 
|-id=716 bgcolor=#d6d6d6
| 165716 ||  || — || August 16, 2001 || Socorro || LINEAR || — || align=right | 6.3 km || 
|-id=717 bgcolor=#d6d6d6
| 165717 ||  || — || August 16, 2001 || Socorro || LINEAR || — || align=right | 6.6 km || 
|-id=718 bgcolor=#d6d6d6
| 165718 ||  || — || August 16, 2001 || Socorro || LINEAR || — || align=right | 5.7 km || 
|-id=719 bgcolor=#d6d6d6
| 165719 ||  || — || August 16, 2001 || Socorro || LINEAR || — || align=right | 5.2 km || 
|-id=720 bgcolor=#d6d6d6
| 165720 ||  || — || August 18, 2001 || Socorro || LINEAR || THM || align=right | 5.0 km || 
|-id=721 bgcolor=#d6d6d6
| 165721 ||  || — || August 16, 2001 || Socorro || LINEAR || — || align=right | 7.2 km || 
|-id=722 bgcolor=#d6d6d6
| 165722 ||  || — || August 20, 2001 || Oakley || C. Wolfe || TIR || align=right | 6.5 km || 
|-id=723 bgcolor=#d6d6d6
| 165723 ||  || — || August 17, 2001 || Socorro || LINEAR || — || align=right | 6.2 km || 
|-id=724 bgcolor=#d6d6d6
| 165724 ||  || — || August 20, 2001 || Palomar || NEAT || — || align=right | 5.5 km || 
|-id=725 bgcolor=#d6d6d6
| 165725 ||  || — || August 18, 2001 || Socorro || LINEAR || HYG || align=right | 5.2 km || 
|-id=726 bgcolor=#d6d6d6
| 165726 ||  || — || August 18, 2001 || Anderson Mesa || LONEOS || — || align=right | 5.3 km || 
|-id=727 bgcolor=#d6d6d6
| 165727 ||  || — || August 18, 2001 || Anderson Mesa || LONEOS || TIR || align=right | 6.1 km || 
|-id=728 bgcolor=#d6d6d6
| 165728 ||  || — || August 22, 2001 || Socorro || LINEAR || — || align=right | 5.7 km || 
|-id=729 bgcolor=#d6d6d6
| 165729 ||  || — || August 22, 2001 || Socorro || LINEAR || — || align=right | 7.2 km || 
|-id=730 bgcolor=#d6d6d6
| 165730 ||  || — || August 19, 2001 || Socorro || LINEAR || — || align=right | 5.4 km || 
|-id=731 bgcolor=#d6d6d6
| 165731 ||  || — || August 19, 2001 || Socorro || LINEAR || THM || align=right | 6.0 km || 
|-id=732 bgcolor=#d6d6d6
| 165732 ||  || — || August 20, 2001 || Socorro || LINEAR || — || align=right | 6.1 km || 
|-id=733 bgcolor=#d6d6d6
| 165733 ||  || — || August 20, 2001 || Socorro || LINEAR || EOS || align=right | 5.0 km || 
|-id=734 bgcolor=#d6d6d6
| 165734 ||  || — || August 20, 2001 || Socorro || LINEAR || — || align=right | 4.7 km || 
|-id=735 bgcolor=#d6d6d6
| 165735 ||  || — || August 20, 2001 || Socorro || LINEAR || — || align=right | 5.3 km || 
|-id=736 bgcolor=#d6d6d6
| 165736 ||  || — || August 20, 2001 || Socorro || LINEAR || — || align=right | 5.8 km || 
|-id=737 bgcolor=#d6d6d6
| 165737 ||  || — || August 21, 2001 || Socorro || LINEAR || — || align=right | 5.1 km || 
|-id=738 bgcolor=#d6d6d6
| 165738 ||  || — || August 23, 2001 || Anderson Mesa || LONEOS || — || align=right | 4.7 km || 
|-id=739 bgcolor=#d6d6d6
| 165739 ||  || — || August 23, 2001 || Anderson Mesa || LONEOS || — || align=right | 5.9 km || 
|-id=740 bgcolor=#d6d6d6
| 165740 ||  || — || August 23, 2001 || Anderson Mesa || LONEOS || EOS || align=right | 3.8 km || 
|-id=741 bgcolor=#d6d6d6
| 165741 ||  || — || August 23, 2001 || Anderson Mesa || LONEOS || URS || align=right | 5.9 km || 
|-id=742 bgcolor=#d6d6d6
| 165742 ||  || — || August 23, 2001 || Anderson Mesa || LONEOS || EOS || align=right | 3.9 km || 
|-id=743 bgcolor=#d6d6d6
| 165743 ||  || — || August 22, 2001 || Haleakala || NEAT || TIR || align=right | 4.2 km || 
|-id=744 bgcolor=#d6d6d6
| 165744 ||  || — || August 24, 2001 || Haleakala || NEAT || — || align=right | 5.5 km || 
|-id=745 bgcolor=#d6d6d6
| 165745 ||  || — || August 26, 2001 || Haleakala || NEAT || — || align=right | 4.9 km || 
|-id=746 bgcolor=#d6d6d6
| 165746 ||  || — || August 25, 2001 || Socorro || LINEAR || — || align=right | 5.1 km || 
|-id=747 bgcolor=#d6d6d6
| 165747 ||  || — || August 21, 2001 || Socorro || LINEAR || — || align=right | 5.3 km || 
|-id=748 bgcolor=#d6d6d6
| 165748 ||  || — || August 21, 2001 || Kitt Peak || Spacewatch || — || align=right | 6.3 km || 
|-id=749 bgcolor=#d6d6d6
| 165749 ||  || — || August 21, 2001 || Haleakala || NEAT || — || align=right | 7.7 km || 
|-id=750 bgcolor=#d6d6d6
| 165750 ||  || — || August 22, 2001 || Socorro || LINEAR || — || align=right | 10 km || 
|-id=751 bgcolor=#fefefe
| 165751 ||  || — || August 22, 2001 || Socorro || LINEAR || H || align=right data-sort-value="0.95" | 950 m || 
|-id=752 bgcolor=#d6d6d6
| 165752 ||  || — || August 23, 2001 || Anderson Mesa || LONEOS || ALA || align=right | 8.0 km || 
|-id=753 bgcolor=#d6d6d6
| 165753 ||  || — || August 23, 2001 || Anderson Mesa || LONEOS || EOS || align=right | 3.8 km || 
|-id=754 bgcolor=#d6d6d6
| 165754 ||  || — || August 23, 2001 || Anderson Mesa || LONEOS || — || align=right | 6.0 km || 
|-id=755 bgcolor=#d6d6d6
| 165755 ||  || — || August 23, 2001 || Anderson Mesa || LONEOS || — || align=right | 4.1 km || 
|-id=756 bgcolor=#d6d6d6
| 165756 ||  || — || August 23, 2001 || Anderson Mesa || LONEOS || — || align=right | 4.6 km || 
|-id=757 bgcolor=#d6d6d6
| 165757 ||  || — || August 23, 2001 || Anderson Mesa || LONEOS || — || align=right | 4.7 km || 
|-id=758 bgcolor=#d6d6d6
| 165758 ||  || — || August 23, 2001 || Anderson Mesa || LONEOS || EOS || align=right | 3.5 km || 
|-id=759 bgcolor=#d6d6d6
| 165759 ||  || — || August 24, 2001 || Anderson Mesa || LONEOS || — || align=right | 6.2 km || 
|-id=760 bgcolor=#d6d6d6
| 165760 ||  || — || August 24, 2001 || Anderson Mesa || LONEOS || — || align=right | 6.4 km || 
|-id=761 bgcolor=#d6d6d6
| 165761 ||  || — || August 24, 2001 || Anderson Mesa || LONEOS || — || align=right | 7.9 km || 
|-id=762 bgcolor=#d6d6d6
| 165762 ||  || — || August 24, 2001 || Anderson Mesa || LONEOS || — || align=right | 5.0 km || 
|-id=763 bgcolor=#d6d6d6
| 165763 ||  || — || August 24, 2001 || Anderson Mesa || LONEOS || — || align=right | 5.4 km || 
|-id=764 bgcolor=#d6d6d6
| 165764 ||  || — || August 24, 2001 || Socorro || LINEAR || — || align=right | 5.2 km || 
|-id=765 bgcolor=#FA8072
| 165765 ||  || — || August 24, 2001 || Socorro || LINEAR || — || align=right data-sort-value="0.90" | 900 m || 
|-id=766 bgcolor=#d6d6d6
| 165766 ||  || — || August 24, 2001 || Socorro || LINEAR || — || align=right | 5.1 km || 
|-id=767 bgcolor=#d6d6d6
| 165767 ||  || — || August 24, 2001 || Socorro || LINEAR || EOS || align=right | 4.6 km || 
|-id=768 bgcolor=#d6d6d6
| 165768 ||  || — || August 24, 2001 || Socorro || LINEAR || — || align=right | 5.6 km || 
|-id=769 bgcolor=#d6d6d6
| 165769 ||  || — || August 24, 2001 || Socorro || LINEAR || EOS || align=right | 3.8 km || 
|-id=770 bgcolor=#d6d6d6
| 165770 ||  || — || August 24, 2001 || Haleakala || NEAT || — || align=right | 6.1 km || 
|-id=771 bgcolor=#d6d6d6
| 165771 ||  || — || August 24, 2001 || Haleakala || NEAT || — || align=right | 7.6 km || 
|-id=772 bgcolor=#d6d6d6
| 165772 ||  || — || August 25, 2001 || Socorro || LINEAR || HYG || align=right | 5.6 km || 
|-id=773 bgcolor=#d6d6d6
| 165773 ||  || — || August 25, 2001 || Anderson Mesa || LONEOS || ALA || align=right | 6.6 km || 
|-id=774 bgcolor=#d6d6d6
| 165774 ||  || — || August 25, 2001 || Socorro || LINEAR || EOS || align=right | 3.2 km || 
|-id=775 bgcolor=#d6d6d6
| 165775 ||  || — || August 25, 2001 || Socorro || LINEAR || — || align=right | 4.7 km || 
|-id=776 bgcolor=#d6d6d6
| 165776 ||  || — || August 26, 2001 || Socorro || LINEAR || — || align=right | 3.8 km || 
|-id=777 bgcolor=#d6d6d6
| 165777 ||  || — || August 26, 2001 || Anderson Mesa || LONEOS || — || align=right | 5.7 km || 
|-id=778 bgcolor=#d6d6d6
| 165778 ||  || — || August 20, 2001 || Socorro || LINEAR || — || align=right | 5.9 km || 
|-id=779 bgcolor=#d6d6d6
| 165779 ||  || — || August 20, 2001 || Socorro || LINEAR || EOS || align=right | 3.6 km || 
|-id=780 bgcolor=#d6d6d6
| 165780 ||  || — || August 19, 2001 || Socorro || LINEAR || — || align=right | 7.2 km || 
|-id=781 bgcolor=#d6d6d6
| 165781 ||  || — || August 18, 2001 || Palomar || NEAT || — || align=right | 8.6 km || 
|-id=782 bgcolor=#d6d6d6
| 165782 ||  || — || August 27, 2001 || Anderson Mesa || LONEOS || EOS || align=right | 3.2 km || 
|-id=783 bgcolor=#d6d6d6
| 165783 ||  || — || September 7, 2001 || Socorro || LINEAR || EOS || align=right | 3.3 km || 
|-id=784 bgcolor=#d6d6d6
| 165784 ||  || — || September 9, 2001 || Desert Eagle || W. K. Y. Yeung || — || align=right | 7.6 km || 
|-id=785 bgcolor=#d6d6d6
| 165785 ||  || — || September 9, 2001 || Desert Eagle || W. K. Y. Yeung || — || align=right | 6.2 km || 
|-id=786 bgcolor=#d6d6d6
| 165786 ||  || — || September 9, 2001 || Desert Eagle || W. K. Y. Yeung || EOS || align=right | 4.7 km || 
|-id=787 bgcolor=#d6d6d6
| 165787 ||  || — || September 10, 2001 || Socorro || LINEAR || — || align=right | 8.2 km || 
|-id=788 bgcolor=#d6d6d6
| 165788 ||  || — || September 7, 2001 || Socorro || LINEAR || — || align=right | 5.3 km || 
|-id=789 bgcolor=#d6d6d6
| 165789 ||  || — || September 7, 2001 || Socorro || LINEAR || — || align=right | 4.4 km || 
|-id=790 bgcolor=#d6d6d6
| 165790 ||  || — || September 7, 2001 || Socorro || LINEAR || EOS || align=right | 3.0 km || 
|-id=791 bgcolor=#d6d6d6
| 165791 ||  || — || September 7, 2001 || Socorro || LINEAR || HYG || align=right | 4.2 km || 
|-id=792 bgcolor=#d6d6d6
| 165792 ||  || — || September 8, 2001 || Socorro || LINEAR || LIX || align=right | 4.6 km || 
|-id=793 bgcolor=#d6d6d6
| 165793 ||  || — || September 8, 2001 || Socorro || LINEAR || EOS || align=right | 4.9 km || 
|-id=794 bgcolor=#d6d6d6
| 165794 ||  || — || September 8, 2001 || Socorro || LINEAR || — || align=right | 4.9 km || 
|-id=795 bgcolor=#d6d6d6
| 165795 ||  || — || September 8, 2001 || Socorro || LINEAR || — || align=right | 4.8 km || 
|-id=796 bgcolor=#d6d6d6
| 165796 ||  || — || September 8, 2001 || Socorro || LINEAR || — || align=right | 4.2 km || 
|-id=797 bgcolor=#d6d6d6
| 165797 ||  || — || September 8, 2001 || Socorro || LINEAR || — || align=right | 3.9 km || 
|-id=798 bgcolor=#d6d6d6
| 165798 ||  || — || September 11, 2001 || Socorro || LINEAR || THM || align=right | 5.6 km || 
|-id=799 bgcolor=#d6d6d6
| 165799 ||  || — || September 11, 2001 || Desert Eagle || W. K. Y. Yeung || VER || align=right | 6.8 km || 
|-id=800 bgcolor=#d6d6d6
| 165800 ||  || — || September 10, 2001 || Socorro || LINEAR || EOS || align=right | 3.8 km || 
|}

165801–165900 

|-bgcolor=#d6d6d6
| 165801 ||  || — || September 12, 2001 || Socorro || LINEAR || — || align=right | 4.5 km || 
|-id=802 bgcolor=#d6d6d6
| 165802 ||  || — || September 12, 2001 || Socorro || LINEAR || — || align=right | 5.8 km || 
|-id=803 bgcolor=#d6d6d6
| 165803 ||  || — || September 12, 2001 || Socorro || LINEAR || — || align=right | 5.6 km || 
|-id=804 bgcolor=#d6d6d6
| 165804 ||  || — || September 12, 2001 || Socorro || LINEAR || — || align=right | 6.8 km || 
|-id=805 bgcolor=#d6d6d6
| 165805 ||  || — || September 12, 2001 || Socorro || LINEAR || — || align=right | 6.1 km || 
|-id=806 bgcolor=#d6d6d6
| 165806 ||  || — || September 12, 2001 || Socorro || LINEAR || — || align=right | 5.0 km || 
|-id=807 bgcolor=#d6d6d6
| 165807 ||  || — || September 12, 2001 || Socorro || LINEAR || — || align=right | 5.8 km || 
|-id=808 bgcolor=#d6d6d6
| 165808 ||  || — || September 10, 2001 || Socorro || LINEAR || — || align=right | 6.0 km || 
|-id=809 bgcolor=#d6d6d6
| 165809 ||  || — || September 10, 2001 || Socorro || LINEAR || — || align=right | 8.3 km || 
|-id=810 bgcolor=#d6d6d6
| 165810 ||  || — || September 12, 2001 || Socorro || LINEAR || — || align=right | 5.2 km || 
|-id=811 bgcolor=#d6d6d6
| 165811 ||  || — || September 14, 2001 || Palomar || NEAT || — || align=right | 6.7 km || 
|-id=812 bgcolor=#d6d6d6
| 165812 ||  || — || September 11, 2001 || Anderson Mesa || LONEOS || — || align=right | 7.6 km || 
|-id=813 bgcolor=#d6d6d6
| 165813 ||  || — || September 11, 2001 || Anderson Mesa || LONEOS || HYG || align=right | 5.7 km || 
|-id=814 bgcolor=#d6d6d6
| 165814 ||  || — || September 12, 2001 || Kitt Peak || Spacewatch || — || align=right | 5.0 km || 
|-id=815 bgcolor=#d6d6d6
| 165815 ||  || — || September 12, 2001 || Socorro || LINEAR || — || align=right | 5.9 km || 
|-id=816 bgcolor=#d6d6d6
| 165816 ||  || — || September 12, 2001 || Socorro || LINEAR || EOS || align=right | 3.6 km || 
|-id=817 bgcolor=#d6d6d6
| 165817 ||  || — || September 12, 2001 || Socorro || LINEAR || — || align=right | 5.7 km || 
|-id=818 bgcolor=#d6d6d6
| 165818 ||  || — || September 12, 2001 || Socorro || LINEAR || HYG || align=right | 4.3 km || 
|-id=819 bgcolor=#d6d6d6
| 165819 ||  || — || September 12, 2001 || Socorro || LINEAR || — || align=right | 4.2 km || 
|-id=820 bgcolor=#d6d6d6
| 165820 ||  || — || September 12, 2001 || Socorro || LINEAR || — || align=right | 4.0 km || 
|-id=821 bgcolor=#d6d6d6
| 165821 ||  || — || September 12, 2001 || Socorro || LINEAR || — || align=right | 4.5 km || 
|-id=822 bgcolor=#d6d6d6
| 165822 ||  || — || September 12, 2001 || Socorro || LINEAR || ELF || align=right | 6.1 km || 
|-id=823 bgcolor=#d6d6d6
| 165823 ||  || — || September 12, 2001 || Socorro || LINEAR || THM || align=right | 4.4 km || 
|-id=824 bgcolor=#d6d6d6
| 165824 ||  || — || September 12, 2001 || Socorro || LINEAR || — || align=right | 5.7 km || 
|-id=825 bgcolor=#d6d6d6
| 165825 ||  || — || September 12, 2001 || Socorro || LINEAR || KOR || align=right | 2.8 km || 
|-id=826 bgcolor=#d6d6d6
| 165826 ||  || — || September 12, 2001 || Socorro || LINEAR || — || align=right | 3.3 km || 
|-id=827 bgcolor=#d6d6d6
| 165827 ||  || — || September 12, 2001 || Socorro || LINEAR || — || align=right | 5.4 km || 
|-id=828 bgcolor=#d6d6d6
| 165828 ||  || — || September 12, 2001 || Socorro || LINEAR || HYG || align=right | 5.8 km || 
|-id=829 bgcolor=#d6d6d6
| 165829 ||  || — || September 12, 2001 || Socorro || LINEAR || — || align=right | 4.6 km || 
|-id=830 bgcolor=#d6d6d6
| 165830 ||  || — || September 12, 2001 || Socorro || LINEAR || — || align=right | 5.4 km || 
|-id=831 bgcolor=#d6d6d6
| 165831 ||  || — || September 12, 2001 || Socorro || LINEAR || — || align=right | 5.0 km || 
|-id=832 bgcolor=#d6d6d6
| 165832 ||  || — || September 12, 2001 || Socorro || LINEAR || — || align=right | 6.2 km || 
|-id=833 bgcolor=#d6d6d6
| 165833 ||  || — || September 12, 2001 || Socorro || LINEAR || HYG || align=right | 4.1 km || 
|-id=834 bgcolor=#d6d6d6
| 165834 ||  || — || September 12, 2001 || Socorro || LINEAR || — || align=right | 4.6 km || 
|-id=835 bgcolor=#d6d6d6
| 165835 ||  || — || September 12, 2001 || Socorro || LINEAR || — || align=right | 2.8 km || 
|-id=836 bgcolor=#d6d6d6
| 165836 ||  || — || September 12, 2001 || Socorro || LINEAR || HYG || align=right | 5.2 km || 
|-id=837 bgcolor=#d6d6d6
| 165837 ||  || — || September 12, 2001 || Socorro || LINEAR || — || align=right | 5.7 km || 
|-id=838 bgcolor=#d6d6d6
| 165838 ||  || — || September 15, 2001 || Palomar || NEAT || — || align=right | 5.5 km || 
|-id=839 bgcolor=#d6d6d6
| 165839 ||  || — || September 6, 2001 || Palomar || NEAT || — || align=right | 5.8 km || 
|-id=840 bgcolor=#d6d6d6
| 165840 ||  || — || September 9, 2001 || Anderson Mesa || LONEOS || ALA || align=right | 6.9 km || 
|-id=841 bgcolor=#d6d6d6
| 165841 ||  || — || September 9, 2001 || Anderson Mesa || LONEOS || — || align=right | 6.5 km || 
|-id=842 bgcolor=#d6d6d6
| 165842 ||  || — || September 12, 2001 || Socorro || LINEAR || HYG || align=right | 6.2 km || 
|-id=843 bgcolor=#d6d6d6
| 165843 ||  || — || September 15, 2001 || Palomar || NEAT || — || align=right | 5.7 km || 
|-id=844 bgcolor=#d6d6d6
| 165844 ||  || — || September 18, 2001 || Kitt Peak || Spacewatch || THM || align=right | 3.5 km || 
|-id=845 bgcolor=#d6d6d6
| 165845 ||  || — || September 16, 2001 || Socorro || LINEAR || — || align=right | 5.3 km || 
|-id=846 bgcolor=#d6d6d6
| 165846 ||  || — || September 16, 2001 || Socorro || LINEAR || EOS || align=right | 3.5 km || 
|-id=847 bgcolor=#d6d6d6
| 165847 ||  || — || September 16, 2001 || Socorro || LINEAR || — || align=right | 4.0 km || 
|-id=848 bgcolor=#d6d6d6
| 165848 ||  || — || September 16, 2001 || Socorro || LINEAR || — || align=right | 7.0 km || 
|-id=849 bgcolor=#d6d6d6
| 165849 ||  || — || September 16, 2001 || Socorro || LINEAR || HYG || align=right | 5.9 km || 
|-id=850 bgcolor=#d6d6d6
| 165850 ||  || — || September 16, 2001 || Socorro || LINEAR || THM || align=right | 4.1 km || 
|-id=851 bgcolor=#d6d6d6
| 165851 ||  || — || September 16, 2001 || Socorro || LINEAR || HYG || align=right | 5.0 km || 
|-id=852 bgcolor=#d6d6d6
| 165852 ||  || — || September 16, 2001 || Socorro || LINEAR || — || align=right | 6.8 km || 
|-id=853 bgcolor=#d6d6d6
| 165853 ||  || — || September 16, 2001 || Socorro || LINEAR || — || align=right | 5.7 km || 
|-id=854 bgcolor=#d6d6d6
| 165854 ||  || — || September 16, 2001 || Socorro || LINEAR || HYG || align=right | 4.5 km || 
|-id=855 bgcolor=#d6d6d6
| 165855 ||  || — || September 16, 2001 || Socorro || LINEAR || THM || align=right | 4.4 km || 
|-id=856 bgcolor=#d6d6d6
| 165856 ||  || — || September 16, 2001 || Socorro || LINEAR || — || align=right | 6.4 km || 
|-id=857 bgcolor=#d6d6d6
| 165857 ||  || — || September 16, 2001 || Socorro || LINEAR || MEL || align=right | 5.4 km || 
|-id=858 bgcolor=#d6d6d6
| 165858 ||  || — || September 16, 2001 || Socorro || LINEAR || HYG || align=right | 5.4 km || 
|-id=859 bgcolor=#d6d6d6
| 165859 ||  || — || September 16, 2001 || Socorro || LINEAR || — || align=right | 5.1 km || 
|-id=860 bgcolor=#d6d6d6
| 165860 ||  || — || September 16, 2001 || Socorro || LINEAR || — || align=right | 5.3 km || 
|-id=861 bgcolor=#d6d6d6
| 165861 ||  || — || September 16, 2001 || Socorro || LINEAR || — || align=right | 5.9 km || 
|-id=862 bgcolor=#d6d6d6
| 165862 ||  || — || September 19, 2001 || Socorro || LINEAR || — || align=right | 5.3 km || 
|-id=863 bgcolor=#d6d6d6
| 165863 ||  || — || September 20, 2001 || Socorro || LINEAR || THB || align=right | 6.3 km || 
|-id=864 bgcolor=#d6d6d6
| 165864 ||  || — || September 20, 2001 || Socorro || LINEAR || VER || align=right | 5.4 km || 
|-id=865 bgcolor=#d6d6d6
| 165865 ||  || — || September 20, 2001 || Socorro || LINEAR || TIR || align=right | 4.7 km || 
|-id=866 bgcolor=#d6d6d6
| 165866 ||  || — || September 20, 2001 || Socorro || LINEAR || — || align=right | 4.5 km || 
|-id=867 bgcolor=#d6d6d6
| 165867 ||  || — || September 20, 2001 || Socorro || LINEAR || HYG || align=right | 4.5 km || 
|-id=868 bgcolor=#d6d6d6
| 165868 ||  || — || September 20, 2001 || Socorro || LINEAR || HYG || align=right | 5.3 km || 
|-id=869 bgcolor=#d6d6d6
| 165869 ||  || — || September 20, 2001 || Socorro || LINEAR || — || align=right | 6.4 km || 
|-id=870 bgcolor=#d6d6d6
| 165870 ||  || — || September 16, 2001 || Socorro || LINEAR || — || align=right | 3.6 km || 
|-id=871 bgcolor=#d6d6d6
| 165871 ||  || — || September 16, 2001 || Socorro || LINEAR || — || align=right | 5.9 km || 
|-id=872 bgcolor=#d6d6d6
| 165872 ||  || — || September 16, 2001 || Socorro || LINEAR || — || align=right | 4.3 km || 
|-id=873 bgcolor=#d6d6d6
| 165873 ||  || — || September 16, 2001 || Socorro || LINEAR || HYG || align=right | 5.0 km || 
|-id=874 bgcolor=#E9E9E9
| 165874 ||  || — || September 16, 2001 || Socorro || LINEAR || AGN || align=right | 2.2 km || 
|-id=875 bgcolor=#fefefe
| 165875 ||  || — || September 16, 2001 || Socorro || LINEAR || — || align=right | 1.1 km || 
|-id=876 bgcolor=#d6d6d6
| 165876 ||  || — || September 16, 2001 || Socorro || LINEAR || — || align=right | 5.3 km || 
|-id=877 bgcolor=#d6d6d6
| 165877 ||  || — || September 16, 2001 || Socorro || LINEAR || — || align=right | 8.1 km || 
|-id=878 bgcolor=#d6d6d6
| 165878 ||  || — || September 16, 2001 || Socorro || LINEAR || — || align=right | 5.0 km || 
|-id=879 bgcolor=#d6d6d6
| 165879 ||  || — || September 16, 2001 || Socorro || LINEAR || VER || align=right | 5.9 km || 
|-id=880 bgcolor=#d6d6d6
| 165880 ||  || — || September 16, 2001 || Socorro || LINEAR || HYG || align=right | 4.5 km || 
|-id=881 bgcolor=#d6d6d6
| 165881 ||  || — || September 17, 2001 || Socorro || LINEAR || — || align=right | 5.5 km || 
|-id=882 bgcolor=#d6d6d6
| 165882 ||  || — || September 17, 2001 || Socorro || LINEAR || LIX || align=right | 7.1 km || 
|-id=883 bgcolor=#d6d6d6
| 165883 ||  || — || September 17, 2001 || Socorro || LINEAR || — || align=right | 6.4 km || 
|-id=884 bgcolor=#d6d6d6
| 165884 ||  || — || September 19, 2001 || Socorro || LINEAR || — || align=right | 4.8 km || 
|-id=885 bgcolor=#d6d6d6
| 165885 ||  || — || September 19, 2001 || Socorro || LINEAR || HYG || align=right | 6.1 km || 
|-id=886 bgcolor=#d6d6d6
| 165886 ||  || — || September 19, 2001 || Socorro || LINEAR || THM || align=right | 3.2 km || 
|-id=887 bgcolor=#d6d6d6
| 165887 ||  || — || September 19, 2001 || Socorro || LINEAR || THM || align=right | 2.9 km || 
|-id=888 bgcolor=#d6d6d6
| 165888 ||  || — || September 19, 2001 || Socorro || LINEAR || THM || align=right | 3.4 km || 
|-id=889 bgcolor=#d6d6d6
| 165889 ||  || — || September 19, 2001 || Socorro || LINEAR || EOS || align=right | 3.7 km || 
|-id=890 bgcolor=#d6d6d6
| 165890 ||  || — || September 19, 2001 || Socorro || LINEAR || THM || align=right | 4.0 km || 
|-id=891 bgcolor=#d6d6d6
| 165891 ||  || — || September 19, 2001 || Socorro || LINEAR || — || align=right | 5.0 km || 
|-id=892 bgcolor=#d6d6d6
| 165892 ||  || — || September 19, 2001 || Socorro || LINEAR || — || align=right | 3.4 km || 
|-id=893 bgcolor=#d6d6d6
| 165893 ||  || — || September 19, 2001 || Socorro || LINEAR || URS || align=right | 5.1 km || 
|-id=894 bgcolor=#d6d6d6
| 165894 ||  || — || September 19, 2001 || Socorro || LINEAR || THM || align=right | 3.4 km || 
|-id=895 bgcolor=#d6d6d6
| 165895 ||  || — || September 19, 2001 || Socorro || LINEAR || VER || align=right | 3.8 km || 
|-id=896 bgcolor=#d6d6d6
| 165896 ||  || — || September 19, 2001 || Socorro || LINEAR || VER || align=right | 5.0 km || 
|-id=897 bgcolor=#d6d6d6
| 165897 ||  || — || September 19, 2001 || Socorro || LINEAR || — || align=right | 5.1 km || 
|-id=898 bgcolor=#d6d6d6
| 165898 ||  || — || September 19, 2001 || Socorro || LINEAR || — || align=right | 4.7 km || 
|-id=899 bgcolor=#d6d6d6
| 165899 ||  || — || September 23, 2001 || Anderson Mesa || LONEOS || LUT || align=right | 11 km || 
|-id=900 bgcolor=#d6d6d6
| 165900 ||  || — || September 19, 2001 || Socorro || LINEAR || HYG || align=right | 5.8 km || 
|}

165901–166000 

|-bgcolor=#d6d6d6
| 165901 ||  || — || September 20, 2001 || Socorro || LINEAR || — || align=right | 5.0 km || 
|-id=902 bgcolor=#d6d6d6
| 165902 ||  || — || September 21, 2001 || Socorro || LINEAR || URS || align=right | 6.1 km || 
|-id=903 bgcolor=#d6d6d6
| 165903 ||  || — || September 21, 2001 || Socorro || LINEAR || HYG || align=right | 4.9 km || 
|-id=904 bgcolor=#d6d6d6
| 165904 ||  || — || September 19, 2001 || Socorro || LINEAR || URS || align=right | 5.0 km || 
|-id=905 bgcolor=#d6d6d6
| 165905 ||  || — || September 23, 2001 || Socorro || LINEAR || HYG || align=right | 5.3 km || 
|-id=906 bgcolor=#d6d6d6
| 165906 ||  || — || September 25, 2001 || Socorro || LINEAR || TIR || align=right | 4.4 km || 
|-id=907 bgcolor=#d6d6d6
| 165907 ||  || — || September 19, 2001 || Socorro || LINEAR || EOS || align=right | 3.8 km || 
|-id=908 bgcolor=#d6d6d6
| 165908 ||  || — || September 19, 2001 || Palomar || NEAT || — || align=right | 7.4 km || 
|-id=909 bgcolor=#d6d6d6
| 165909 ||  || — || September 23, 2001 || Palomar || NEAT || — || align=right | 4.1 km || 
|-id=910 bgcolor=#d6d6d6
| 165910 ||  || — || October 10, 2001 || Palomar || NEAT || HYG || align=right | 5.5 km || 
|-id=911 bgcolor=#d6d6d6
| 165911 ||  || — || October 10, 2001 || Palomar || NEAT || EUP || align=right | 8.7 km || 
|-id=912 bgcolor=#d6d6d6
| 165912 ||  || — || October 11, 2001 || San Marcello || L. Tesi, M. Tombelli || EUP || align=right | 9.4 km || 
|-id=913 bgcolor=#d6d6d6
| 165913 ||  || — || October 9, 2001 || Socorro || LINEAR || — || align=right | 7.6 km || 
|-id=914 bgcolor=#d6d6d6
| 165914 ||  || — || October 14, 2001 || Socorro || LINEAR || 7:4 || align=right | 6.9 km || 
|-id=915 bgcolor=#d6d6d6
| 165915 ||  || — || October 14, 2001 || Socorro || LINEAR || VER || align=right | 6.1 km || 
|-id=916 bgcolor=#d6d6d6
| 165916 ||  || — || October 14, 2001 || Socorro || LINEAR || — || align=right | 4.5 km || 
|-id=917 bgcolor=#d6d6d6
| 165917 ||  || — || October 13, 2001 || Socorro || LINEAR || — || align=right | 7.6 km || 
|-id=918 bgcolor=#d6d6d6
| 165918 ||  || — || October 15, 2001 || Socorro || LINEAR || LUT || align=right | 8.2 km || 
|-id=919 bgcolor=#d6d6d6
| 165919 ||  || — || October 12, 2001 || Haleakala || NEAT || — || align=right | 6.7 km || 
|-id=920 bgcolor=#d6d6d6
| 165920 ||  || — || October 15, 2001 || Kitt Peak || Spacewatch || — || align=right | 4.1 km || 
|-id=921 bgcolor=#d6d6d6
| 165921 ||  || — || October 12, 2001 || Haleakala || NEAT || 7:4 || align=right | 6.9 km || 
|-id=922 bgcolor=#d6d6d6
| 165922 ||  || — || October 10, 2001 || Palomar || NEAT || — || align=right | 4.2 km || 
|-id=923 bgcolor=#d6d6d6
| 165923 ||  || — || October 10, 2001 || Palomar || NEAT || HYG || align=right | 5.0 km || 
|-id=924 bgcolor=#d6d6d6
| 165924 ||  || — || October 10, 2001 || Palomar || NEAT || — || align=right | 5.9 km || 
|-id=925 bgcolor=#d6d6d6
| 165925 ||  || — || October 11, 2001 || Palomar || NEAT || — || align=right | 4.9 km || 
|-id=926 bgcolor=#d6d6d6
| 165926 ||  || — || October 11, 2001 || Palomar || NEAT || — || align=right | 4.8 km || 
|-id=927 bgcolor=#d6d6d6
| 165927 ||  || — || October 14, 2001 || Socorro || LINEAR || — || align=right | 5.2 km || 
|-id=928 bgcolor=#d6d6d6
| 165928 ||  || — || October 15, 2001 || Palomar || NEAT || 7:4 || align=right | 9.5 km || 
|-id=929 bgcolor=#d6d6d6
| 165929 ||  || — || October 13, 2001 || Palomar || NEAT || THB || align=right | 7.5 km || 
|-id=930 bgcolor=#d6d6d6
| 165930 ||  || — || October 13, 2001 || Kitt Peak || Spacewatch || — || align=right | 5.4 km || 
|-id=931 bgcolor=#d6d6d6
| 165931 ||  || — || October 13, 2001 || Palomar || NEAT || EOS || align=right | 4.2 km || 
|-id=932 bgcolor=#d6d6d6
| 165932 ||  || — || October 14, 2001 || Palomar || NEAT || — || align=right | 7.2 km || 
|-id=933 bgcolor=#fefefe
| 165933 ||  || — || October 24, 2001 || Socorro || LINEAR || — || align=right data-sort-value="0.94" | 940 m || 
|-id=934 bgcolor=#d6d6d6
| 165934 ||  || — || October 17, 2001 || Socorro || LINEAR || — || align=right | 5.9 km || 
|-id=935 bgcolor=#d6d6d6
| 165935 ||  || — || October 18, 2001 || Socorro || LINEAR || — || align=right | 4.9 km || 
|-id=936 bgcolor=#d6d6d6
| 165936 ||  || — || October 16, 2001 || Socorro || LINEAR || — || align=right | 6.2 km || 
|-id=937 bgcolor=#d6d6d6
| 165937 ||  || — || October 16, 2001 || Socorro || LINEAR || EUP || align=right | 6.1 km || 
|-id=938 bgcolor=#d6d6d6
| 165938 ||  || — || October 17, 2001 || Socorro || LINEAR || VER || align=right | 5.0 km || 
|-id=939 bgcolor=#d6d6d6
| 165939 ||  || — || October 17, 2001 || Socorro || LINEAR || SYL7:4 || align=right | 5.4 km || 
|-id=940 bgcolor=#d6d6d6
| 165940 ||  || — || October 20, 2001 || Socorro || LINEAR || EUP || align=right | 6.1 km || 
|-id=941 bgcolor=#d6d6d6
| 165941 ||  || — || October 21, 2001 || Socorro || LINEAR || — || align=right | 4.1 km || 
|-id=942 bgcolor=#d6d6d6
| 165942 ||  || — || October 22, 2001 || Palomar || NEAT || — || align=right | 4.6 km || 
|-id=943 bgcolor=#d6d6d6
| 165943 ||  || — || October 23, 2001 || Socorro || LINEAR || — || align=right | 4.3 km || 
|-id=944 bgcolor=#d6d6d6
| 165944 ||  || — || October 23, 2001 || Socorro || LINEAR || — || align=right | 6.5 km || 
|-id=945 bgcolor=#d6d6d6
| 165945 ||  || — || October 20, 2001 || Socorro || LINEAR || — || align=right | 6.2 km || 
|-id=946 bgcolor=#d6d6d6
| 165946 ||  || — || October 19, 2001 || Palomar || NEAT || HYG || align=right | 4.4 km || 
|-id=947 bgcolor=#fefefe
| 165947 ||  || — || November 12, 2001 || Socorro || LINEAR || — || align=right | 1.3 km || 
|-id=948 bgcolor=#fefefe
| 165948 ||  || — || November 14, 2001 || Kitt Peak || Spacewatch || — || align=right | 1.00 km || 
|-id=949 bgcolor=#d6d6d6
| 165949 ||  || — || November 18, 2001 || Socorro || LINEAR || Tj (2.93) || align=right | 7.2 km || 
|-id=950 bgcolor=#fefefe
| 165950 ||  || — || November 21, 2001 || Socorro || LINEAR || — || align=right data-sort-value="0.82" | 820 m || 
|-id=951 bgcolor=#d6d6d6
| 165951 ||  || — || November 20, 2001 || Socorro || LINEAR || HYG || align=right | 4.4 km || 
|-id=952 bgcolor=#d6d6d6
| 165952 ||  || — || November 21, 2001 || Socorro || LINEAR || HYG || align=right | 5.1 km || 
|-id=953 bgcolor=#fefefe
| 165953 ||  || — || December 9, 2001 || Socorro || LINEAR || — || align=right | 1.4 km || 
|-id=954 bgcolor=#fefefe
| 165954 ||  || — || December 9, 2001 || Socorro || LINEAR || — || align=right | 1.6 km || 
|-id=955 bgcolor=#fefefe
| 165955 ||  || — || December 14, 2001 || Kitt Peak || Spacewatch || FLO || align=right | 1.1 km || 
|-id=956 bgcolor=#fefefe
| 165956 ||  || — || December 10, 2001 || Socorro || LINEAR || — || align=right | 1.9 km || 
|-id=957 bgcolor=#fefefe
| 165957 ||  || — || December 13, 2001 || Socorro || LINEAR || — || align=right | 1.2 km || 
|-id=958 bgcolor=#fefefe
| 165958 ||  || — || December 14, 2001 || Socorro || LINEAR || — || align=right | 1.1 km || 
|-id=959 bgcolor=#fefefe
| 165959 ||  || — || December 11, 2001 || Socorro || LINEAR || — || align=right | 1.3 km || 
|-id=960 bgcolor=#d6d6d6
| 165960 ||  || — || December 14, 2001 || Socorro || LINEAR || HYG || align=right | 4.3 km || 
|-id=961 bgcolor=#fefefe
| 165961 ||  || — || December 14, 2001 || Socorro || LINEAR || FLO || align=right | 1.0 km || 
|-id=962 bgcolor=#fefefe
| 165962 ||  || — || December 14, 2001 || Socorro || LINEAR || — || align=right | 2.5 km || 
|-id=963 bgcolor=#fefefe
| 165963 ||  || — || December 14, 2001 || Socorro || LINEAR || FLO || align=right data-sort-value="0.85" | 850 m || 
|-id=964 bgcolor=#fefefe
| 165964 ||  || — || December 14, 2001 || Socorro || LINEAR || — || align=right data-sort-value="0.94" | 940 m || 
|-id=965 bgcolor=#fefefe
| 165965 ||  || — || December 14, 2001 || Socorro || LINEAR || — || align=right | 1.3 km || 
|-id=966 bgcolor=#fefefe
| 165966 ||  || — || December 14, 2001 || Socorro || LINEAR || — || align=right | 1.0 km || 
|-id=967 bgcolor=#fefefe
| 165967 ||  || — || December 14, 2001 || Socorro || LINEAR || — || align=right | 1.4 km || 
|-id=968 bgcolor=#fefefe
| 165968 ||  || — || December 11, 2001 || Socorro || LINEAR || FLO || align=right | 2.6 km || 
|-id=969 bgcolor=#fefefe
| 165969 ||  || — || December 11, 2001 || Socorro || LINEAR || — || align=right | 1.8 km || 
|-id=970 bgcolor=#fefefe
| 165970 ||  || — || December 15, 2001 || Socorro || LINEAR || — || align=right | 1.9 km || 
|-id=971 bgcolor=#fefefe
| 165971 ||  || — || December 15, 2001 || Socorro || LINEAR || — || align=right | 1.3 km || 
|-id=972 bgcolor=#fefefe
| 165972 ||  || — || December 14, 2001 || Socorro || LINEAR || — || align=right | 1.6 km || 
|-id=973 bgcolor=#fefefe
| 165973 ||  || — || December 14, 2001 || Socorro || LINEAR || FLO || align=right | 1.3 km || 
|-id=974 bgcolor=#fefefe
| 165974 ||  || — || December 10, 2001 || Socorro || LINEAR || — || align=right | 1.2 km || 
|-id=975 bgcolor=#fefefe
| 165975 ||  || — || December 23, 2001 || Kitt Peak || Spacewatch || — || align=right | 2.0 km || 
|-id=976 bgcolor=#fefefe
| 165976 ||  || — || December 18, 2001 || Socorro || LINEAR || FLO || align=right | 1.2 km || 
|-id=977 bgcolor=#fefefe
| 165977 ||  || — || December 18, 2001 || Socorro || LINEAR || — || align=right | 1.0 km || 
|-id=978 bgcolor=#fefefe
| 165978 ||  || — || December 18, 2001 || Socorro || LINEAR || — || align=right | 1.0 km || 
|-id=979 bgcolor=#fefefe
| 165979 ||  || — || December 18, 2001 || Socorro || LINEAR || — || align=right | 1.6 km || 
|-id=980 bgcolor=#fefefe
| 165980 ||  || — || December 18, 2001 || Socorro || LINEAR || — || align=right data-sort-value="0.87" | 870 m || 
|-id=981 bgcolor=#fefefe
| 165981 ||  || — || December 18, 2001 || Socorro || LINEAR || V || align=right | 1.2 km || 
|-id=982 bgcolor=#fefefe
| 165982 ||  || — || December 18, 2001 || Palomar || NEAT || FLO || align=right | 3.6 km || 
|-id=983 bgcolor=#fefefe
| 165983 ||  || — || December 17, 2001 || Socorro || LINEAR || — || align=right | 1.1 km || 
|-id=984 bgcolor=#fefefe
| 165984 ||  || — || December 18, 2001 || Socorro || LINEAR || — || align=right | 1.5 km || 
|-id=985 bgcolor=#fefefe
| 165985 ||  || — || December 19, 2001 || Palomar || NEAT || FLO || align=right | 1.0 km || 
|-id=986 bgcolor=#fefefe
| 165986 ||  || — || December 18, 2001 || Socorro || LINEAR || — || align=right | 1.4 km || 
|-id=987 bgcolor=#fefefe
| 165987 ||  || — || December 17, 2001 || Socorro || LINEAR || — || align=right | 1.3 km || 
|-id=988 bgcolor=#fefefe
| 165988 ||  || — || December 18, 2001 || Kitt Peak || Spacewatch || — || align=right | 1.3 km || 
|-id=989 bgcolor=#fefefe
| 165989 ||  || — || December 23, 2001 || Kitt Peak || Spacewatch || FLO || align=right | 1.0 km || 
|-id=990 bgcolor=#fefefe
| 165990 ||  || — || December 18, 2001 || Socorro || LINEAR || — || align=right data-sort-value="0.86" | 860 m || 
|-id=991 bgcolor=#d6d6d6
| 165991 ||  || — || December 19, 2001 || Palomar || NEAT || SYL7:4 || align=right | 7.7 km || 
|-id=992 bgcolor=#fefefe
| 165992 ||  || — || December 17, 2001 || Socorro || LINEAR || FLO || align=right | 1.2 km || 
|-id=993 bgcolor=#fefefe
| 165993 ||  || — || January 9, 2002 || Oaxaca || J. M. Roe || — || align=right | 1.3 km || 
|-id=994 bgcolor=#fefefe
| 165994 ||  || — || January 6, 2002 || Haleakala || NEAT || — || align=right | 1.6 km || 
|-id=995 bgcolor=#fefefe
| 165995 ||  || — || January 5, 2002 || Haleakala || NEAT || — || align=right | 1.3 km || 
|-id=996 bgcolor=#fefefe
| 165996 ||  || — || January 9, 2002 || Socorro || LINEAR || FLO || align=right | 1.1 km || 
|-id=997 bgcolor=#fefefe
| 165997 ||  || — || January 9, 2002 || Socorro || LINEAR || KLI || align=right | 3.3 km || 
|-id=998 bgcolor=#fefefe
| 165998 ||  || — || January 12, 2002 || Kitt Peak || Spacewatch || — || align=right | 1.3 km || 
|-id=999 bgcolor=#fefefe
| 165999 ||  || — || January 9, 2002 || Socorro || LINEAR || — || align=right | 1.0 km || 
|-id=000 bgcolor=#fefefe
| 166000 ||  || — || January 9, 2002 || Socorro || LINEAR || — || align=right | 1.3 km || 
|}

References

External links 
 Discovery Circumstances: Numbered Minor Planets (165001)–(170000) (IAU Minor Planet Center)

0165